

140001–140100 

|-bgcolor=#d6d6d6
| 140001 ||  || — || September 16, 2001 || Socorro || LINEAR || EOS || align=right | 2.9 km || 
|-id=002 bgcolor=#d6d6d6
| 140002 ||  || — || September 16, 2001 || Socorro || LINEAR || — || align=right | 3.8 km || 
|-id=003 bgcolor=#d6d6d6
| 140003 ||  || — || September 16, 2001 || Socorro || LINEAR || — || align=right | 4.7 km || 
|-id=004 bgcolor=#E9E9E9
| 140004 ||  || — || September 16, 2001 || Socorro || LINEAR || — || align=right | 3.5 km || 
|-id=005 bgcolor=#d6d6d6
| 140005 ||  || — || September 16, 2001 || Socorro || LINEAR || KOR || align=right | 2.1 km || 
|-id=006 bgcolor=#d6d6d6
| 140006 ||  || — || September 16, 2001 || Socorro || LINEAR || — || align=right | 8.7 km || 
|-id=007 bgcolor=#d6d6d6
| 140007 ||  || — || September 16, 2001 || Socorro || LINEAR || — || align=right | 5.4 km || 
|-id=008 bgcolor=#fefefe
| 140008 ||  || — || September 16, 2001 || Socorro || LINEAR || MAS || align=right | 1.4 km || 
|-id=009 bgcolor=#fefefe
| 140009 ||  || — || September 16, 2001 || Socorro || LINEAR || NYS || align=right | 1.1 km || 
|-id=010 bgcolor=#E9E9E9
| 140010 ||  || — || September 16, 2001 || Socorro || LINEAR || — || align=right | 2.9 km || 
|-id=011 bgcolor=#d6d6d6
| 140011 ||  || — || September 16, 2001 || Socorro || LINEAR || TEL || align=right | 2.9 km || 
|-id=012 bgcolor=#E9E9E9
| 140012 ||  || — || September 16, 2001 || Socorro || LINEAR || — || align=right | 3.4 km || 
|-id=013 bgcolor=#d6d6d6
| 140013 ||  || — || September 16, 2001 || Socorro || LINEAR || EOS || align=right | 3.8 km || 
|-id=014 bgcolor=#d6d6d6
| 140014 ||  || — || September 16, 2001 || Socorro || LINEAR || KOR || align=right | 2.3 km || 
|-id=015 bgcolor=#d6d6d6
| 140015 ||  || — || September 16, 2001 || Socorro || LINEAR || — || align=right | 5.7 km || 
|-id=016 bgcolor=#E9E9E9
| 140016 ||  || — || September 16, 2001 || Socorro || LINEAR || WIT || align=right | 2.0 km || 
|-id=017 bgcolor=#E9E9E9
| 140017 ||  || — || September 16, 2001 || Socorro || LINEAR || — || align=right | 2.7 km || 
|-id=018 bgcolor=#d6d6d6
| 140018 ||  || — || September 16, 2001 || Socorro || LINEAR || URS || align=right | 5.7 km || 
|-id=019 bgcolor=#d6d6d6
| 140019 ||  || — || September 16, 2001 || Socorro || LINEAR || — || align=right | 6.0 km || 
|-id=020 bgcolor=#E9E9E9
| 140020 ||  || — || September 16, 2001 || Socorro || LINEAR || — || align=right | 3.5 km || 
|-id=021 bgcolor=#d6d6d6
| 140021 ||  || — || September 16, 2001 || Socorro || LINEAR || — || align=right | 5.1 km || 
|-id=022 bgcolor=#E9E9E9
| 140022 ||  || — || September 16, 2001 || Socorro || LINEAR || — || align=right | 2.5 km || 
|-id=023 bgcolor=#d6d6d6
| 140023 ||  || — || September 16, 2001 || Socorro || LINEAR || EOS || align=right | 4.4 km || 
|-id=024 bgcolor=#d6d6d6
| 140024 ||  || — || September 16, 2001 || Socorro || LINEAR || — || align=right | 6.3 km || 
|-id=025 bgcolor=#d6d6d6
| 140025 ||  || — || September 16, 2001 || Socorro || LINEAR || EOS || align=right | 4.5 km || 
|-id=026 bgcolor=#fefefe
| 140026 ||  || — || September 17, 2001 || Socorro || LINEAR || — || align=right | 1.6 km || 
|-id=027 bgcolor=#d6d6d6
| 140027 ||  || — || September 17, 2001 || Socorro || LINEAR || — || align=right | 9.2 km || 
|-id=028 bgcolor=#d6d6d6
| 140028 ||  || — || September 17, 2001 || Socorro || LINEAR || — || align=right | 5.3 km || 
|-id=029 bgcolor=#E9E9E9
| 140029 ||  || — || September 17, 2001 || Socorro || LINEAR || — || align=right | 3.3 km || 
|-id=030 bgcolor=#d6d6d6
| 140030 ||  || — || September 17, 2001 || Socorro || LINEAR || — || align=right | 4.8 km || 
|-id=031 bgcolor=#d6d6d6
| 140031 ||  || — || September 17, 2001 || Socorro || LINEAR || SAN || align=right | 3.1 km || 
|-id=032 bgcolor=#d6d6d6
| 140032 ||  || — || September 17, 2001 || Socorro || LINEAR || EOS || align=right | 4.4 km || 
|-id=033 bgcolor=#d6d6d6
| 140033 ||  || — || September 17, 2001 || Socorro || LINEAR || — || align=right | 6.7 km || 
|-id=034 bgcolor=#d6d6d6
| 140034 ||  || — || September 17, 2001 || Socorro || LINEAR || — || align=right | 3.7 km || 
|-id=035 bgcolor=#fefefe
| 140035 ||  || — || September 17, 2001 || Socorro || LINEAR || — || align=right | 1.4 km || 
|-id=036 bgcolor=#E9E9E9
| 140036 ||  || — || September 17, 2001 || Socorro || LINEAR || GEF || align=right | 3.6 km || 
|-id=037 bgcolor=#d6d6d6
| 140037 ||  || — || September 17, 2001 || Socorro || LINEAR || — || align=right | 5.7 km || 
|-id=038 bgcolor=#E9E9E9
| 140038 Kurushima ||  ||  || September 18, 2001 || Kuma Kogen || A. Nakamura || WIT || align=right | 1.8 km || 
|-id=039 bgcolor=#FFC2E0
| 140039 ||  || — || September 19, 2001 || Kitt Peak || Spacewatch || APO +1kmPHA || align=right data-sort-value="0.83" | 830 m || 
|-id=040 bgcolor=#E9E9E9
| 140040 ||  || — || September 19, 2001 || Anderson Mesa || LONEOS || — || align=right | 3.6 km || 
|-id=041 bgcolor=#d6d6d6
| 140041 ||  || — || September 19, 2001 || Socorro || LINEAR || KOR || align=right | 2.1 km || 
|-id=042 bgcolor=#E9E9E9
| 140042 ||  || — || September 19, 2001 || Socorro || LINEAR || — || align=right | 3.0 km || 
|-id=043 bgcolor=#d6d6d6
| 140043 ||  || — || September 20, 2001 || Socorro || LINEAR || BRA || align=right | 2.8 km || 
|-id=044 bgcolor=#E9E9E9
| 140044 ||  || — || September 20, 2001 || Socorro || LINEAR || — || align=right | 2.9 km || 
|-id=045 bgcolor=#E9E9E9
| 140045 ||  || — || September 20, 2001 || Socorro || LINEAR || — || align=right | 3.9 km || 
|-id=046 bgcolor=#d6d6d6
| 140046 ||  || — || September 20, 2001 || Socorro || LINEAR || EOS || align=right | 3.4 km || 
|-id=047 bgcolor=#E9E9E9
| 140047 ||  || — || September 20, 2001 || Socorro || LINEAR || — || align=right | 1.6 km || 
|-id=048 bgcolor=#E9E9E9
| 140048 ||  || — || September 20, 2001 || Socorro || LINEAR || — || align=right | 6.3 km || 
|-id=049 bgcolor=#E9E9E9
| 140049 ||  || — || September 20, 2001 || Socorro || LINEAR || — || align=right | 2.5 km || 
|-id=050 bgcolor=#E9E9E9
| 140050 ||  || — || September 20, 2001 || Socorro || LINEAR || — || align=right | 2.7 km || 
|-id=051 bgcolor=#d6d6d6
| 140051 ||  || — || September 20, 2001 || Socorro || LINEAR || — || align=right | 4.0 km || 
|-id=052 bgcolor=#E9E9E9
| 140052 ||  || — || September 20, 2001 || Socorro || LINEAR || — || align=right | 4.5 km || 
|-id=053 bgcolor=#d6d6d6
| 140053 ||  || — || September 20, 2001 || Socorro || LINEAR || KOR || align=right | 1.9 km || 
|-id=054 bgcolor=#d6d6d6
| 140054 ||  || — || September 20, 2001 || Socorro || LINEAR || EOS || align=right | 3.3 km || 
|-id=055 bgcolor=#d6d6d6
| 140055 ||  || — || September 20, 2001 || Socorro || LINEAR || — || align=right | 3.2 km || 
|-id=056 bgcolor=#d6d6d6
| 140056 ||  || — || September 20, 2001 || Socorro || LINEAR || EOS || align=right | 3.3 km || 
|-id=057 bgcolor=#E9E9E9
| 140057 ||  || — || September 20, 2001 || Socorro || LINEAR || — || align=right | 1.8 km || 
|-id=058 bgcolor=#E9E9E9
| 140058 ||  || — || September 20, 2001 || Socorro || LINEAR || — || align=right | 4.4 km || 
|-id=059 bgcolor=#E9E9E9
| 140059 ||  || — || September 20, 2001 || Socorro || LINEAR || — || align=right | 3.0 km || 
|-id=060 bgcolor=#d6d6d6
| 140060 ||  || — || September 20, 2001 || Socorro || LINEAR || EOS || align=right | 3.7 km || 
|-id=061 bgcolor=#E9E9E9
| 140061 ||  || — || September 20, 2001 || Socorro || LINEAR || WIT || align=right | 1.5 km || 
|-id=062 bgcolor=#d6d6d6
| 140062 ||  || — || September 20, 2001 || Socorro || LINEAR || — || align=right | 4.9 km || 
|-id=063 bgcolor=#d6d6d6
| 140063 ||  || — || September 20, 2001 || Socorro || LINEAR || — || align=right | 5.8 km || 
|-id=064 bgcolor=#d6d6d6
| 140064 ||  || — || September 20, 2001 || Socorro || LINEAR || — || align=right | 4.5 km || 
|-id=065 bgcolor=#d6d6d6
| 140065 ||  || — || September 20, 2001 || Socorro || LINEAR || — || align=right | 4.6 km || 
|-id=066 bgcolor=#d6d6d6
| 140066 ||  || — || September 20, 2001 || Socorro || LINEAR || — || align=right | 8.1 km || 
|-id=067 bgcolor=#d6d6d6
| 140067 ||  || — || September 20, 2001 || Socorro || LINEAR || THB || align=right | 7.7 km || 
|-id=068 bgcolor=#d6d6d6
| 140068 ||  || — || September 20, 2001 || Socorro || LINEAR || EUP || align=right | 10 km || 
|-id=069 bgcolor=#d6d6d6
| 140069 ||  || — || September 20, 2001 || Socorro || LINEAR || — || align=right | 7.1 km || 
|-id=070 bgcolor=#d6d6d6
| 140070 ||  || — || September 20, 2001 || Socorro || LINEAR || — || align=right | 8.1 km || 
|-id=071 bgcolor=#E9E9E9
| 140071 ||  || — || September 20, 2001 || Desert Eagle || W. K. Y. Yeung || WIT || align=right | 1.6 km || 
|-id=072 bgcolor=#d6d6d6
| 140072 ||  || — || September 20, 2001 || Desert Eagle || W. K. Y. Yeung || EUP || align=right | 6.9 km || 
|-id=073 bgcolor=#d6d6d6
| 140073 ||  || — || September 20, 2001 || Desert Eagle || W. K. Y. Yeung || — || align=right | 4.3 km || 
|-id=074 bgcolor=#E9E9E9
| 140074 ||  || — || September 16, 2001 || Socorro || LINEAR || — || align=right | 2.4 km || 
|-id=075 bgcolor=#d6d6d6
| 140075 ||  || — || September 16, 2001 || Socorro || LINEAR || EOS || align=right | 2.9 km || 
|-id=076 bgcolor=#E9E9E9
| 140076 ||  || — || September 16, 2001 || Socorro || LINEAR || NEM || align=right | 3.2 km || 
|-id=077 bgcolor=#d6d6d6
| 140077 ||  || — || September 16, 2001 || Socorro || LINEAR || EOS || align=right | 3.5 km || 
|-id=078 bgcolor=#d6d6d6
| 140078 ||  || — || September 16, 2001 || Socorro || LINEAR || — || align=right | 4.2 km || 
|-id=079 bgcolor=#E9E9E9
| 140079 ||  || — || September 16, 2001 || Socorro || LINEAR || GEF || align=right | 2.3 km || 
|-id=080 bgcolor=#E9E9E9
| 140080 ||  || — || September 16, 2001 || Socorro || LINEAR || — || align=right | 4.1 km || 
|-id=081 bgcolor=#E9E9E9
| 140081 ||  || — || September 16, 2001 || Socorro || LINEAR || — || align=right | 2.6 km || 
|-id=082 bgcolor=#E9E9E9
| 140082 ||  || — || September 16, 2001 || Socorro || LINEAR || — || align=right | 3.3 km || 
|-id=083 bgcolor=#E9E9E9
| 140083 ||  || — || September 16, 2001 || Socorro || LINEAR || AGN || align=right | 2.3 km || 
|-id=084 bgcolor=#E9E9E9
| 140084 ||  || — || September 16, 2001 || Socorro || LINEAR || — || align=right | 2.5 km || 
|-id=085 bgcolor=#d6d6d6
| 140085 ||  || — || September 16, 2001 || Socorro || LINEAR || — || align=right | 7.5 km || 
|-id=086 bgcolor=#E9E9E9
| 140086 ||  || — || September 16, 2001 || Socorro || LINEAR || HOF || align=right | 3.6 km || 
|-id=087 bgcolor=#d6d6d6
| 140087 ||  || — || September 16, 2001 || Socorro || LINEAR || — || align=right | 4.1 km || 
|-id=088 bgcolor=#E9E9E9
| 140088 ||  || — || September 16, 2001 || Socorro || LINEAR || — || align=right | 3.6 km || 
|-id=089 bgcolor=#d6d6d6
| 140089 ||  || — || September 16, 2001 || Socorro || LINEAR || — || align=right | 5.9 km || 
|-id=090 bgcolor=#d6d6d6
| 140090 ||  || — || September 16, 2001 || Socorro || LINEAR || KOR || align=right | 2.2 km || 
|-id=091 bgcolor=#d6d6d6
| 140091 ||  || — || September 16, 2001 || Socorro || LINEAR || — || align=right | 5.4 km || 
|-id=092 bgcolor=#E9E9E9
| 140092 ||  || — || September 16, 2001 || Socorro || LINEAR || PAE || align=right | 5.5 km || 
|-id=093 bgcolor=#E9E9E9
| 140093 ||  || — || September 16, 2001 || Socorro || LINEAR || — || align=right | 4.9 km || 
|-id=094 bgcolor=#E9E9E9
| 140094 ||  || — || September 16, 2001 || Socorro || LINEAR || — || align=right | 4.4 km || 
|-id=095 bgcolor=#E9E9E9
| 140095 ||  || — || September 16, 2001 || Socorro || LINEAR || 526 || align=right | 4.6 km || 
|-id=096 bgcolor=#E9E9E9
| 140096 ||  || — || September 16, 2001 || Socorro || LINEAR || — || align=right | 2.1 km || 
|-id=097 bgcolor=#E9E9E9
| 140097 ||  || — || September 16, 2001 || Socorro || LINEAR || — || align=right | 3.5 km || 
|-id=098 bgcolor=#d6d6d6
| 140098 ||  || — || September 16, 2001 || Socorro || LINEAR || — || align=right | 5.3 km || 
|-id=099 bgcolor=#E9E9E9
| 140099 ||  || — || September 16, 2001 || Socorro || LINEAR || — || align=right | 2.4 km || 
|-id=100 bgcolor=#d6d6d6
| 140100 ||  || — || September 16, 2001 || Socorro || LINEAR || — || align=right | 5.5 km || 
|}

140101–140200 

|-bgcolor=#fefefe
| 140101 ||  || — || September 16, 2001 || Socorro || LINEAR || NYS || align=right | 1.4 km || 
|-id=102 bgcolor=#d6d6d6
| 140102 ||  || — || September 16, 2001 || Socorro || LINEAR || — || align=right | 3.3 km || 
|-id=103 bgcolor=#E9E9E9
| 140103 ||  || — || September 16, 2001 || Socorro || LINEAR || — || align=right | 4.2 km || 
|-id=104 bgcolor=#E9E9E9
| 140104 ||  || — || September 16, 2001 || Socorro || LINEAR || — || align=right | 5.9 km || 
|-id=105 bgcolor=#E9E9E9
| 140105 ||  || — || September 16, 2001 || Socorro || LINEAR || — || align=right | 4.0 km || 
|-id=106 bgcolor=#d6d6d6
| 140106 ||  || — || September 16, 2001 || Socorro || LINEAR || ALA || align=right | 6.2 km || 
|-id=107 bgcolor=#d6d6d6
| 140107 ||  || — || September 16, 2001 || Socorro || LINEAR || — || align=right | 4.7 km || 
|-id=108 bgcolor=#d6d6d6
| 140108 ||  || — || September 16, 2001 || Socorro || LINEAR || — || align=right | 4.7 km || 
|-id=109 bgcolor=#d6d6d6
| 140109 ||  || — || September 16, 2001 || Socorro || LINEAR || LIX || align=right | 8.2 km || 
|-id=110 bgcolor=#d6d6d6
| 140110 ||  || — || September 16, 2001 || Socorro || LINEAR || — || align=right | 5.3 km || 
|-id=111 bgcolor=#E9E9E9
| 140111 ||  || — || September 16, 2001 || Socorro || LINEAR || WIT || align=right | 1.8 km || 
|-id=112 bgcolor=#d6d6d6
| 140112 ||  || — || September 16, 2001 || Socorro || LINEAR || KOR || align=right | 2.7 km || 
|-id=113 bgcolor=#d6d6d6
| 140113 ||  || — || September 16, 2001 || Socorro || LINEAR || — || align=right | 6.3 km || 
|-id=114 bgcolor=#d6d6d6
| 140114 ||  || — || September 16, 2001 || Socorro || LINEAR || KOR || align=right | 2.4 km || 
|-id=115 bgcolor=#d6d6d6
| 140115 ||  || — || September 16, 2001 || Socorro || LINEAR || KOR || align=right | 2.4 km || 
|-id=116 bgcolor=#E9E9E9
| 140116 ||  || — || September 16, 2001 || Socorro || LINEAR || — || align=right | 1.8 km || 
|-id=117 bgcolor=#d6d6d6
| 140117 ||  || — || September 16, 2001 || Socorro || LINEAR || — || align=right | 4.9 km || 
|-id=118 bgcolor=#E9E9E9
| 140118 ||  || — || September 16, 2001 || Socorro || LINEAR || — || align=right | 3.7 km || 
|-id=119 bgcolor=#E9E9E9
| 140119 ||  || — || September 16, 2001 || Socorro || LINEAR || WIT || align=right | 1.7 km || 
|-id=120 bgcolor=#E9E9E9
| 140120 ||  || — || September 16, 2001 || Socorro || LINEAR || — || align=right | 3.8 km || 
|-id=121 bgcolor=#d6d6d6
| 140121 ||  || — || September 16, 2001 || Socorro || LINEAR || KOR || align=right | 2.6 km || 
|-id=122 bgcolor=#d6d6d6
| 140122 ||  || — || September 16, 2001 || Socorro || LINEAR || EOS || align=right | 3.4 km || 
|-id=123 bgcolor=#d6d6d6
| 140123 ||  || — || September 16, 2001 || Socorro || LINEAR || — || align=right | 3.7 km || 
|-id=124 bgcolor=#E9E9E9
| 140124 ||  || — || September 16, 2001 || Socorro || LINEAR || AGN || align=right | 1.7 km || 
|-id=125 bgcolor=#d6d6d6
| 140125 ||  || — || September 16, 2001 || Socorro || LINEAR || KOR || align=right | 2.3 km || 
|-id=126 bgcolor=#E9E9E9
| 140126 ||  || — || September 16, 2001 || Socorro || LINEAR || — || align=right | 2.5 km || 
|-id=127 bgcolor=#E9E9E9
| 140127 ||  || — || September 16, 2001 || Socorro || LINEAR || — || align=right | 3.9 km || 
|-id=128 bgcolor=#E9E9E9
| 140128 ||  || — || September 16, 2001 || Socorro || LINEAR || AGN || align=right | 2.3 km || 
|-id=129 bgcolor=#d6d6d6
| 140129 ||  || — || September 16, 2001 || Socorro || LINEAR || — || align=right | 8.0 km || 
|-id=130 bgcolor=#fefefe
| 140130 ||  || — || September 16, 2001 || Socorro || LINEAR || — || align=right | 1.3 km || 
|-id=131 bgcolor=#d6d6d6
| 140131 ||  || — || September 16, 2001 || Socorro || LINEAR || — || align=right | 2.7 km || 
|-id=132 bgcolor=#E9E9E9
| 140132 ||  || — || September 16, 2001 || Socorro || LINEAR || — || align=right | 3.0 km || 
|-id=133 bgcolor=#d6d6d6
| 140133 ||  || — || September 16, 2001 || Socorro || LINEAR || — || align=right | 4.2 km || 
|-id=134 bgcolor=#E9E9E9
| 140134 ||  || — || September 17, 2001 || Socorro || LINEAR || — || align=right | 3.9 km || 
|-id=135 bgcolor=#E9E9E9
| 140135 ||  || — || September 17, 2001 || Socorro || LINEAR || — || align=right | 4.7 km || 
|-id=136 bgcolor=#d6d6d6
| 140136 ||  || — || September 17, 2001 || Socorro || LINEAR || ALA || align=right | 8.7 km || 
|-id=137 bgcolor=#d6d6d6
| 140137 ||  || — || September 17, 2001 || Socorro || LINEAR || EOS || align=right | 4.3 km || 
|-id=138 bgcolor=#d6d6d6
| 140138 ||  || — || September 17, 2001 || Socorro || LINEAR || — || align=right | 3.2 km || 
|-id=139 bgcolor=#E9E9E9
| 140139 ||  || — || September 17, 2001 || Socorro || LINEAR || — || align=right | 2.7 km || 
|-id=140 bgcolor=#E9E9E9
| 140140 ||  || — || September 17, 2001 || Socorro || LINEAR || GEF || align=right | 2.4 km || 
|-id=141 bgcolor=#d6d6d6
| 140141 ||  || — || September 17, 2001 || Socorro || LINEAR || KOR || align=right | 3.1 km || 
|-id=142 bgcolor=#E9E9E9
| 140142 ||  || — || September 17, 2001 || Socorro || LINEAR || — || align=right | 6.3 km || 
|-id=143 bgcolor=#d6d6d6
| 140143 ||  || — || September 17, 2001 || Socorro || LINEAR || — || align=right | 5.9 km || 
|-id=144 bgcolor=#d6d6d6
| 140144 ||  || — || September 17, 2001 || Socorro || LINEAR || — || align=right | 4.3 km || 
|-id=145 bgcolor=#d6d6d6
| 140145 ||  || — || September 17, 2001 || Socorro || LINEAR || — || align=right | 5.6 km || 
|-id=146 bgcolor=#d6d6d6
| 140146 ||  || — || September 17, 2001 || Socorro || LINEAR || — || align=right | 5.8 km || 
|-id=147 bgcolor=#d6d6d6
| 140147 ||  || — || September 17, 2001 || Socorro || LINEAR || EOS || align=right | 3.1 km || 
|-id=148 bgcolor=#d6d6d6
| 140148 ||  || — || September 17, 2001 || Socorro || LINEAR || EOS || align=right | 4.7 km || 
|-id=149 bgcolor=#d6d6d6
| 140149 ||  || — || September 17, 2001 || Socorro || LINEAR || KOR || align=right | 3.7 km || 
|-id=150 bgcolor=#d6d6d6
| 140150 ||  || — || September 17, 2001 || Socorro || LINEAR || — || align=right | 4.6 km || 
|-id=151 bgcolor=#d6d6d6
| 140151 ||  || — || September 17, 2001 || Socorro || LINEAR || EOS || align=right | 6.3 km || 
|-id=152 bgcolor=#E9E9E9
| 140152 ||  || — || September 19, 2001 || Socorro || LINEAR || — || align=right | 4.9 km || 
|-id=153 bgcolor=#d6d6d6
| 140153 ||  || — || September 19, 2001 || Socorro || LINEAR || KAR || align=right | 1.7 km || 
|-id=154 bgcolor=#E9E9E9
| 140154 ||  || — || September 19, 2001 || Socorro || LINEAR || — || align=right | 4.5 km || 
|-id=155 bgcolor=#d6d6d6
| 140155 ||  || — || September 19, 2001 || Socorro || LINEAR || KAR || align=right | 2.1 km || 
|-id=156 bgcolor=#d6d6d6
| 140156 ||  || — || September 19, 2001 || Socorro || LINEAR || EOS || align=right | 3.6 km || 
|-id=157 bgcolor=#d6d6d6
| 140157 ||  || — || September 19, 2001 || Socorro || LINEAR || KAR || align=right | 2.1 km || 
|-id=158 bgcolor=#FFC2E0
| 140158 ||  || — || September 19, 2001 || Socorro || LINEAR || APOPHA || align=right data-sort-value="0.57" | 570 m || 
|-id=159 bgcolor=#E9E9E9
| 140159 ||  || — || September 16, 2001 || Socorro || LINEAR || — || align=right | 2.5 km || 
|-id=160 bgcolor=#E9E9E9
| 140160 ||  || — || September 16, 2001 || Socorro || LINEAR || WIT || align=right | 2.5 km || 
|-id=161 bgcolor=#E9E9E9
| 140161 ||  || — || September 16, 2001 || Socorro || LINEAR || — || align=right | 2.1 km || 
|-id=162 bgcolor=#d6d6d6
| 140162 ||  || — || September 16, 2001 || Socorro || LINEAR || — || align=right | 5.2 km || 
|-id=163 bgcolor=#E9E9E9
| 140163 ||  || — || September 16, 2001 || Socorro || LINEAR || HOF || align=right | 4.0 km || 
|-id=164 bgcolor=#d6d6d6
| 140164 ||  || — || September 16, 2001 || Socorro || LINEAR || — || align=right | 7.1 km || 
|-id=165 bgcolor=#E9E9E9
| 140165 ||  || — || September 17, 2001 || Socorro || LINEAR || — || align=right | 3.0 km || 
|-id=166 bgcolor=#d6d6d6
| 140166 ||  || — || September 17, 2001 || Socorro || LINEAR || — || align=right | 5.7 km || 
|-id=167 bgcolor=#d6d6d6
| 140167 ||  || — || September 17, 2001 || Socorro || LINEAR || — || align=right | 4.7 km || 
|-id=168 bgcolor=#E9E9E9
| 140168 ||  || — || September 17, 2001 || Socorro || LINEAR || — || align=right | 7.6 km || 
|-id=169 bgcolor=#fefefe
| 140169 ||  || — || September 19, 2001 || Socorro || LINEAR || ERI || align=right | 1.9 km || 
|-id=170 bgcolor=#E9E9E9
| 140170 ||  || — || September 19, 2001 || Socorro || LINEAR || — || align=right | 3.7 km || 
|-id=171 bgcolor=#E9E9E9
| 140171 ||  || — || September 19, 2001 || Socorro || LINEAR || — || align=right | 2.4 km || 
|-id=172 bgcolor=#E9E9E9
| 140172 ||  || — || September 19, 2001 || Socorro || LINEAR || PAD || align=right | 4.1 km || 
|-id=173 bgcolor=#E9E9E9
| 140173 ||  || — || September 19, 2001 || Socorro || LINEAR || — || align=right | 2.6 km || 
|-id=174 bgcolor=#E9E9E9
| 140174 ||  || — || September 19, 2001 || Socorro || LINEAR || — || align=right | 2.5 km || 
|-id=175 bgcolor=#E9E9E9
| 140175 ||  || — || September 19, 2001 || Socorro || LINEAR || — || align=right | 2.3 km || 
|-id=176 bgcolor=#d6d6d6
| 140176 ||  || — || September 19, 2001 || Socorro || LINEAR || EOS || align=right | 3.0 km || 
|-id=177 bgcolor=#E9E9E9
| 140177 ||  || — || September 19, 2001 || Socorro || LINEAR || — || align=right | 3.6 km || 
|-id=178 bgcolor=#E9E9E9
| 140178 ||  || — || September 19, 2001 || Socorro || LINEAR || — || align=right | 3.2 km || 
|-id=179 bgcolor=#d6d6d6
| 140179 ||  || — || September 19, 2001 || Socorro || LINEAR || KOR || align=right | 2.6 km || 
|-id=180 bgcolor=#d6d6d6
| 140180 ||  || — || September 19, 2001 || Socorro || LINEAR || — || align=right | 6.2 km || 
|-id=181 bgcolor=#E9E9E9
| 140181 ||  || — || September 19, 2001 || Socorro || LINEAR || — || align=right | 3.1 km || 
|-id=182 bgcolor=#E9E9E9
| 140182 ||  || — || September 19, 2001 || Socorro || LINEAR || HEN || align=right | 1.5 km || 
|-id=183 bgcolor=#E9E9E9
| 140183 ||  || — || September 19, 2001 || Socorro || LINEAR || HOF || align=right | 5.7 km || 
|-id=184 bgcolor=#d6d6d6
| 140184 ||  || — || September 19, 2001 || Socorro || LINEAR || — || align=right | 3.4 km || 
|-id=185 bgcolor=#d6d6d6
| 140185 ||  || — || September 19, 2001 || Socorro || LINEAR || — || align=right | 4.3 km || 
|-id=186 bgcolor=#d6d6d6
| 140186 ||  || — || September 19, 2001 || Socorro || LINEAR || KAR || align=right | 2.0 km || 
|-id=187 bgcolor=#E9E9E9
| 140187 ||  || — || September 19, 2001 || Socorro || LINEAR || — || align=right | 4.1 km || 
|-id=188 bgcolor=#fefefe
| 140188 ||  || — || September 19, 2001 || Socorro || LINEAR || V || align=right | 1.1 km || 
|-id=189 bgcolor=#E9E9E9
| 140189 ||  || — || September 19, 2001 || Socorro || LINEAR || GEF || align=right | 2.2 km || 
|-id=190 bgcolor=#d6d6d6
| 140190 ||  || — || September 19, 2001 || Socorro || LINEAR || — || align=right | 3.9 km || 
|-id=191 bgcolor=#d6d6d6
| 140191 ||  || — || September 19, 2001 || Socorro || LINEAR || — || align=right | 4.2 km || 
|-id=192 bgcolor=#E9E9E9
| 140192 ||  || — || September 19, 2001 || Socorro || LINEAR || — || align=right | 4.0 km || 
|-id=193 bgcolor=#E9E9E9
| 140193 ||  || — || September 19, 2001 || Socorro || LINEAR || — || align=right | 3.4 km || 
|-id=194 bgcolor=#E9E9E9
| 140194 ||  || — || September 19, 2001 || Socorro || LINEAR || — || align=right | 3.2 km || 
|-id=195 bgcolor=#E9E9E9
| 140195 ||  || — || September 19, 2001 || Socorro || LINEAR || — || align=right | 4.3 km || 
|-id=196 bgcolor=#d6d6d6
| 140196 ||  || — || September 19, 2001 || Socorro || LINEAR || — || align=right | 3.7 km || 
|-id=197 bgcolor=#d6d6d6
| 140197 ||  || — || September 19, 2001 || Socorro || LINEAR || — || align=right | 4.2 km || 
|-id=198 bgcolor=#d6d6d6
| 140198 ||  || — || September 19, 2001 || Socorro || LINEAR || — || align=right | 4.9 km || 
|-id=199 bgcolor=#d6d6d6
| 140199 ||  || — || September 19, 2001 || Socorro || LINEAR || TEL || align=right | 2.1 km || 
|-id=200 bgcolor=#E9E9E9
| 140200 ||  || — || September 19, 2001 || Socorro || LINEAR || — || align=right | 3.6 km || 
|}

140201–140300 

|-bgcolor=#d6d6d6
| 140201 ||  || — || September 19, 2001 || Socorro || LINEAR || — || align=right | 4.3 km || 
|-id=202 bgcolor=#E9E9E9
| 140202 ||  || — || September 19, 2001 || Socorro || LINEAR || — || align=right | 3.9 km || 
|-id=203 bgcolor=#fefefe
| 140203 ||  || — || September 19, 2001 || Socorro || LINEAR || NYS || align=right | 2.0 km || 
|-id=204 bgcolor=#d6d6d6
| 140204 ||  || — || September 19, 2001 || Socorro || LINEAR || — || align=right | 4.0 km || 
|-id=205 bgcolor=#E9E9E9
| 140205 ||  || — || September 19, 2001 || Socorro || LINEAR || — || align=right | 2.7 km || 
|-id=206 bgcolor=#E9E9E9
| 140206 ||  || — || September 19, 2001 || Socorro || LINEAR || — || align=right | 1.4 km || 
|-id=207 bgcolor=#d6d6d6
| 140207 ||  || — || September 19, 2001 || Socorro || LINEAR || KOR || align=right | 2.3 km || 
|-id=208 bgcolor=#E9E9E9
| 140208 ||  || — || September 19, 2001 || Socorro || LINEAR || — || align=right | 2.4 km || 
|-id=209 bgcolor=#fefefe
| 140209 ||  || — || September 19, 2001 || Socorro || LINEAR || — || align=right | 1.2 km || 
|-id=210 bgcolor=#d6d6d6
| 140210 ||  || — || September 19, 2001 || Socorro || LINEAR || — || align=right | 4.5 km || 
|-id=211 bgcolor=#d6d6d6
| 140211 ||  || — || September 19, 2001 || Socorro || LINEAR || KOR || align=right | 2.7 km || 
|-id=212 bgcolor=#d6d6d6
| 140212 ||  || — || September 19, 2001 || Socorro || LINEAR || — || align=right | 5.4 km || 
|-id=213 bgcolor=#d6d6d6
| 140213 ||  || — || September 19, 2001 || Socorro || LINEAR || THM || align=right | 3.6 km || 
|-id=214 bgcolor=#E9E9E9
| 140214 ||  || — || September 19, 2001 || Socorro || LINEAR || — || align=right | 4.1 km || 
|-id=215 bgcolor=#E9E9E9
| 140215 ||  || — || September 19, 2001 || Socorro || LINEAR || — || align=right | 3.4 km || 
|-id=216 bgcolor=#E9E9E9
| 140216 ||  || — || September 19, 2001 || Socorro || LINEAR || HOF || align=right | 5.4 km || 
|-id=217 bgcolor=#d6d6d6
| 140217 ||  || — || September 19, 2001 || Socorro || LINEAR || — || align=right | 5.4 km || 
|-id=218 bgcolor=#d6d6d6
| 140218 ||  || — || September 19, 2001 || Socorro || LINEAR || — || align=right | 3.4 km || 
|-id=219 bgcolor=#d6d6d6
| 140219 ||  || — || September 19, 2001 || Socorro || LINEAR || — || align=right | 3.6 km || 
|-id=220 bgcolor=#d6d6d6
| 140220 ||  || — || September 19, 2001 || Socorro || LINEAR || — || align=right | 5.7 km || 
|-id=221 bgcolor=#E9E9E9
| 140221 ||  || — || September 19, 2001 || Socorro || LINEAR || XIZ || align=right | 2.5 km || 
|-id=222 bgcolor=#d6d6d6
| 140222 ||  || — || September 19, 2001 || Socorro || LINEAR || KOR || align=right | 2.0 km || 
|-id=223 bgcolor=#d6d6d6
| 140223 ||  || — || September 19, 2001 || Socorro || LINEAR || — || align=right | 3.3 km || 
|-id=224 bgcolor=#d6d6d6
| 140224 ||  || — || September 19, 2001 || Socorro || LINEAR || — || align=right | 3.8 km || 
|-id=225 bgcolor=#E9E9E9
| 140225 ||  || — || September 19, 2001 || Socorro || LINEAR || — || align=right | 3.8 km || 
|-id=226 bgcolor=#d6d6d6
| 140226 ||  || — || September 19, 2001 || Socorro || LINEAR || — || align=right | 4.1 km || 
|-id=227 bgcolor=#d6d6d6
| 140227 ||  || — || September 19, 2001 || Socorro || LINEAR || — || align=right | 5.6 km || 
|-id=228 bgcolor=#d6d6d6
| 140228 ||  || — || September 19, 2001 || Socorro || LINEAR || — || align=right | 3.5 km || 
|-id=229 bgcolor=#d6d6d6
| 140229 ||  || — || September 19, 2001 || Socorro || LINEAR || — || align=right | 4.2 km || 
|-id=230 bgcolor=#d6d6d6
| 140230 ||  || — || September 19, 2001 || Socorro || LINEAR || — || align=right | 3.9 km || 
|-id=231 bgcolor=#d6d6d6
| 140231 ||  || — || September 19, 2001 || Socorro || LINEAR || — || align=right | 4.5 km || 
|-id=232 bgcolor=#d6d6d6
| 140232 ||  || — || September 19, 2001 || Socorro || LINEAR || — || align=right | 4.5 km || 
|-id=233 bgcolor=#d6d6d6
| 140233 ||  || — || September 19, 2001 || Socorro || LINEAR || THM || align=right | 4.1 km || 
|-id=234 bgcolor=#E9E9E9
| 140234 ||  || — || September 19, 2001 || Socorro || LINEAR || MRX || align=right | 3.2 km || 
|-id=235 bgcolor=#d6d6d6
| 140235 ||  || — || September 19, 2001 || Socorro || LINEAR || — || align=right | 4.3 km || 
|-id=236 bgcolor=#E9E9E9
| 140236 ||  || — || September 19, 2001 || Socorro || LINEAR || — || align=right | 1.7 km || 
|-id=237 bgcolor=#d6d6d6
| 140237 ||  || — || September 19, 2001 || Socorro || LINEAR || — || align=right | 5.8 km || 
|-id=238 bgcolor=#d6d6d6
| 140238 ||  || — || September 19, 2001 || Socorro || LINEAR || THM || align=right | 6.2 km || 
|-id=239 bgcolor=#E9E9E9
| 140239 ||  || — || September 19, 2001 || Socorro || LINEAR || — || align=right | 3.5 km || 
|-id=240 bgcolor=#d6d6d6
| 140240 ||  || — || September 19, 2001 || Socorro || LINEAR || — || align=right | 5.1 km || 
|-id=241 bgcolor=#d6d6d6
| 140241 ||  || — || September 19, 2001 || Socorro || LINEAR || KOR || align=right | 2.4 km || 
|-id=242 bgcolor=#fefefe
| 140242 ||  || — || September 19, 2001 || Socorro || LINEAR || — || align=right | 1.2 km || 
|-id=243 bgcolor=#d6d6d6
| 140243 ||  || — || September 19, 2001 || Socorro || LINEAR || EOS || align=right | 3.7 km || 
|-id=244 bgcolor=#d6d6d6
| 140244 ||  || — || September 19, 2001 || Socorro || LINEAR || — || align=right | 3.4 km || 
|-id=245 bgcolor=#d6d6d6
| 140245 ||  || — || September 19, 2001 || Socorro || LINEAR || — || align=right | 6.0 km || 
|-id=246 bgcolor=#E9E9E9
| 140246 ||  || — || September 19, 2001 || Socorro || LINEAR || — || align=right | 4.9 km || 
|-id=247 bgcolor=#d6d6d6
| 140247 ||  || — || September 19, 2001 || Socorro || LINEAR || — || align=right | 4.9 km || 
|-id=248 bgcolor=#d6d6d6
| 140248 ||  || — || September 19, 2001 || Socorro || LINEAR || — || align=right | 4.0 km || 
|-id=249 bgcolor=#E9E9E9
| 140249 ||  || — || September 19, 2001 || Socorro || LINEAR || AGN || align=right | 2.4 km || 
|-id=250 bgcolor=#d6d6d6
| 140250 ||  || — || September 19, 2001 || Socorro || LINEAR || KOR || align=right | 2.3 km || 
|-id=251 bgcolor=#fefefe
| 140251 ||  || — || September 19, 2001 || Socorro || LINEAR || — || align=right | 1.5 km || 
|-id=252 bgcolor=#d6d6d6
| 140252 ||  || — || September 19, 2001 || Socorro || LINEAR || EOS || align=right | 3.2 km || 
|-id=253 bgcolor=#E9E9E9
| 140253 ||  || — || September 19, 2001 || Socorro || LINEAR || — || align=right | 2.5 km || 
|-id=254 bgcolor=#E9E9E9
| 140254 ||  || — || September 19, 2001 || Socorro || LINEAR || AGN || align=right | 1.6 km || 
|-id=255 bgcolor=#d6d6d6
| 140255 ||  || — || September 19, 2001 || Socorro || LINEAR || — || align=right | 7.1 km || 
|-id=256 bgcolor=#d6d6d6
| 140256 ||  || — || September 20, 2001 || Socorro || LINEAR || — || align=right | 4.9 km || 
|-id=257 bgcolor=#E9E9E9
| 140257 ||  || — || September 20, 2001 || Socorro || LINEAR || — || align=right | 2.6 km || 
|-id=258 bgcolor=#d6d6d6
| 140258 ||  || — || September 20, 2001 || Socorro || LINEAR || — || align=right | 3.3 km || 
|-id=259 bgcolor=#d6d6d6
| 140259 ||  || — || September 20, 2001 || Socorro || LINEAR || HYG || align=right | 5.4 km || 
|-id=260 bgcolor=#E9E9E9
| 140260 ||  || — || September 25, 2001 || Farpoint || G. Hug || — || align=right | 2.6 km || 
|-id=261 bgcolor=#E9E9E9
| 140261 ||  || — || September 25, 2001 || Fountain Hills || C. W. Juels, P. R. Holvorcem || ADE || align=right | 6.6 km || 
|-id=262 bgcolor=#d6d6d6
| 140262 ||  || — || September 24, 2001 || Socorro || LINEAR || ALA || align=right | 7.3 km || 
|-id=263 bgcolor=#d6d6d6
| 140263 ||  || — || September 25, 2001 || Desert Eagle || W. K. Y. Yeung || — || align=right | 4.2 km || 
|-id=264 bgcolor=#E9E9E9
| 140264 ||  || — || September 25, 2001 || Desert Eagle || W. K. Y. Yeung || — || align=right | 4.3 km || 
|-id=265 bgcolor=#FA8072
| 140265 ||  || — || September 26, 2001 || Fountain Hills || C. W. Juels, P. R. Holvorcem || — || align=right | 2.3 km || 
|-id=266 bgcolor=#E9E9E9
| 140266 ||  || — || September 16, 2001 || Palomar || NEAT || — || align=right | 3.6 km || 
|-id=267 bgcolor=#d6d6d6
| 140267 ||  || — || September 20, 2001 || Socorro || LINEAR || EOS || align=right | 3.3 km || 
|-id=268 bgcolor=#E9E9E9
| 140268 ||  || — || September 20, 2001 || Socorro || LINEAR || — || align=right | 3.2 km || 
|-id=269 bgcolor=#d6d6d6
| 140269 ||  || — || September 20, 2001 || Socorro || LINEAR || HYG || align=right | 4.1 km || 
|-id=270 bgcolor=#d6d6d6
| 140270 ||  || — || September 20, 2001 || Socorro || LINEAR || HYG || align=right | 6.1 km || 
|-id=271 bgcolor=#d6d6d6
| 140271 ||  || — || September 20, 2001 || Socorro || LINEAR || — || align=right | 5.1 km || 
|-id=272 bgcolor=#fefefe
| 140272 ||  || — || September 21, 2001 || Socorro || LINEAR || NYS || align=right | 1.9 km || 
|-id=273 bgcolor=#d6d6d6
| 140273 ||  || — || September 19, 2001 || Kitt Peak || Spacewatch || — || align=right | 3.5 km || 
|-id=274 bgcolor=#d6d6d6
| 140274 ||  || — || September 21, 2001 || Kitt Peak || Spacewatch || — || align=right | 4.3 km || 
|-id=275 bgcolor=#E9E9E9
| 140275 ||  || — || September 16, 2001 || Palomar || NEAT || GEF || align=right | 3.4 km || 
|-id=276 bgcolor=#E9E9E9
| 140276 ||  || — || September 18, 2001 || Palomar || NEAT || — || align=right | 4.6 km || 
|-id=277 bgcolor=#E9E9E9
| 140277 ||  || — || September 21, 2001 || Palomar || NEAT || — || align=right | 4.7 km || 
|-id=278 bgcolor=#d6d6d6
| 140278 ||  || — || September 21, 2001 || Anderson Mesa || LONEOS || — || align=right | 6.0 km || 
|-id=279 bgcolor=#d6d6d6
| 140279 ||  || — || September 21, 2001 || Anderson Mesa || LONEOS || EOS || align=right | 4.4 km || 
|-id=280 bgcolor=#E9E9E9
| 140280 ||  || — || September 21, 2001 || Anderson Mesa || LONEOS || — || align=right | 5.3 km || 
|-id=281 bgcolor=#d6d6d6
| 140281 ||  || — || September 21, 2001 || Anderson Mesa || LONEOS || EOS || align=right | 4.2 km || 
|-id=282 bgcolor=#d6d6d6
| 140282 ||  || — || September 21, 2001 || Anderson Mesa || LONEOS || — || align=right | 5.7 km || 
|-id=283 bgcolor=#d6d6d6
| 140283 ||  || — || September 21, 2001 || Anderson Mesa || LONEOS || — || align=right | 5.3 km || 
|-id=284 bgcolor=#d6d6d6
| 140284 ||  || — || September 21, 2001 || Socorro || LINEAR || — || align=right | 3.8 km || 
|-id=285 bgcolor=#d6d6d6
| 140285 ||  || — || September 21, 2001 || Palomar || NEAT || — || align=right | 5.9 km || 
|-id=286 bgcolor=#d6d6d6
| 140286 ||  || — || September 22, 2001 || Palomar || NEAT || EOS || align=right | 4.9 km || 
|-id=287 bgcolor=#d6d6d6
| 140287 ||  || — || September 22, 2001 || Palomar || NEAT || — || align=right | 7.6 km || 
|-id=288 bgcolor=#FFC2E0
| 140288 ||  || — || September 29, 2001 || Palomar || NEAT || APO +1kmPHA || align=right | 1.3 km || 
|-id=289 bgcolor=#E9E9E9
| 140289 ||  || — || September 29, 2001 || Palomar || NEAT || GEF || align=right | 2.6 km || 
|-id=290 bgcolor=#E9E9E9
| 140290 ||  || — || September 26, 2001 || Socorro || LINEAR || — || align=right | 3.3 km || 
|-id=291 bgcolor=#E9E9E9
| 140291 ||  || — || September 16, 2001 || Socorro || LINEAR || GEF || align=right | 2.4 km || 
|-id=292 bgcolor=#E9E9E9
| 140292 ||  || — || September 20, 2001 || Socorro || LINEAR || — || align=right | 3.1 km || 
|-id=293 bgcolor=#E9E9E9
| 140293 ||  || — || September 20, 2001 || Socorro || LINEAR || — || align=right | 2.3 km || 
|-id=294 bgcolor=#E9E9E9
| 140294 ||  || — || September 20, 2001 || Socorro || LINEAR || WIT || align=right | 1.4 km || 
|-id=295 bgcolor=#d6d6d6
| 140295 ||  || — || September 20, 2001 || Socorro || LINEAR || KOR || align=right | 2.1 km || 
|-id=296 bgcolor=#d6d6d6
| 140296 ||  || — || September 20, 2001 || Socorro || LINEAR || NAE || align=right | 4.3 km || 
|-id=297 bgcolor=#d6d6d6
| 140297 ||  || — || September 20, 2001 || Socorro || LINEAR || URS || align=right | 7.8 km || 
|-id=298 bgcolor=#E9E9E9
| 140298 ||  || — || September 21, 2001 || Socorro || LINEAR || — || align=right | 3.9 km || 
|-id=299 bgcolor=#E9E9E9
| 140299 ||  || — || September 20, 2001 || Socorro || LINEAR || — || align=right | 4.1 km || 
|-id=300 bgcolor=#d6d6d6
| 140300 ||  || — || September 20, 2001 || Socorro || LINEAR || — || align=right | 3.9 km || 
|}

140301–140400 

|-bgcolor=#E9E9E9
| 140301 ||  || — || September 21, 2001 || Socorro || LINEAR || WIT || align=right | 1.8 km || 
|-id=302 bgcolor=#d6d6d6
| 140302 ||  || — || September 21, 2001 || Socorro || LINEAR || KOR || align=right | 2.0 km || 
|-id=303 bgcolor=#d6d6d6
| 140303 ||  || — || September 21, 2001 || Socorro || LINEAR || — || align=right | 6.6 km || 
|-id=304 bgcolor=#d6d6d6
| 140304 ||  || — || September 21, 2001 || Socorro || LINEAR || — || align=right | 7.6 km || 
|-id=305 bgcolor=#E9E9E9
| 140305 ||  || — || September 21, 2001 || Socorro || LINEAR || PAD || align=right | 3.8 km || 
|-id=306 bgcolor=#d6d6d6
| 140306 ||  || — || September 21, 2001 || Socorro || LINEAR || — || align=right | 4.0 km || 
|-id=307 bgcolor=#d6d6d6
| 140307 ||  || — || September 25, 2001 || Socorro || LINEAR || — || align=right | 4.5 km || 
|-id=308 bgcolor=#E9E9E9
| 140308 ||  || — || September 25, 2001 || Socorro || LINEAR || — || align=right | 3.0 km || 
|-id=309 bgcolor=#fefefe
| 140309 ||  || — || September 21, 2001 || Socorro || LINEAR || FLO || align=right | 1.0 km || 
|-id=310 bgcolor=#d6d6d6
| 140310 ||  || — || September 21, 2001 || Socorro || LINEAR || KOR || align=right | 2.1 km || 
|-id=311 bgcolor=#d6d6d6
| 140311 ||  || — || September 21, 2001 || Socorro || LINEAR || KOR || align=right | 2.1 km || 
|-id=312 bgcolor=#d6d6d6
| 140312 ||  || — || September 21, 2001 || Socorro || LINEAR || — || align=right | 5.3 km || 
|-id=313 bgcolor=#d6d6d6
| 140313 ||  || — || September 21, 2001 || Socorro || LINEAR || — || align=right | 5.4 km || 
|-id=314 bgcolor=#d6d6d6
| 140314 ||  || — || September 23, 2001 || Socorro || LINEAR || — || align=right | 5.3 km || 
|-id=315 bgcolor=#E9E9E9
| 140315 ||  || — || September 25, 2001 || Socorro || LINEAR || — || align=right | 4.9 km || 
|-id=316 bgcolor=#E9E9E9
| 140316 ||  || — || September 25, 2001 || Socorro || LINEAR || — || align=right | 2.6 km || 
|-id=317 bgcolor=#E9E9E9
| 140317 ||  || — || September 25, 2001 || Socorro || LINEAR || — || align=right | 4.6 km || 
|-id=318 bgcolor=#E9E9E9
| 140318 ||  || — || September 25, 2001 || Socorro || LINEAR || — || align=right | 2.6 km || 
|-id=319 bgcolor=#d6d6d6
| 140319 ||  || — || September 18, 2001 || Anderson Mesa || LONEOS || EOS || align=right | 3.5 km || 
|-id=320 bgcolor=#d6d6d6
| 140320 ||  || — || September 18, 2001 || Anderson Mesa || LONEOS || — || align=right | 6.1 km || 
|-id=321 bgcolor=#d6d6d6
| 140321 ||  || — || September 19, 2001 || Socorro || LINEAR || — || align=right | 4.6 km || 
|-id=322 bgcolor=#d6d6d6
| 140322 ||  || — || September 19, 2001 || Kitt Peak || Spacewatch || — || align=right | 2.9 km || 
|-id=323 bgcolor=#E9E9E9
| 140323 ||  || — || September 20, 2001 || Socorro || LINEAR || — || align=right | 3.2 km || 
|-id=324 bgcolor=#fefefe
| 140324 ||  || — || September 20, 2001 || Kitt Peak || Spacewatch || — || align=right data-sort-value="0.98" | 980 m || 
|-id=325 bgcolor=#E9E9E9
| 140325 ||  || — || September 21, 2001 || Anderson Mesa || LONEOS || — || align=right | 2.8 km || 
|-id=326 bgcolor=#d6d6d6
| 140326 ||  || — || September 21, 2001 || Anderson Mesa || LONEOS || — || align=right | 5.3 km || 
|-id=327 bgcolor=#d6d6d6
| 140327 ||  || — || September 21, 2001 || Anderson Mesa || LONEOS || — || align=right | 3.4 km || 
|-id=328 bgcolor=#d6d6d6
| 140328 ||  || — || September 22, 2001 || Palomar || NEAT || EOS || align=right | 4.2 km || 
|-id=329 bgcolor=#E9E9E9
| 140329 ||  || — || September 23, 2001 || Palomar || NEAT || — || align=right | 4.2 km || 
|-id=330 bgcolor=#d6d6d6
| 140330 ||  || — || September 26, 2001 || Socorro || LINEAR || BRA || align=right | 2.4 km || 
|-id=331 bgcolor=#E9E9E9
| 140331 ||  || — || September 26, 2001 || Socorro || LINEAR || GER || align=right | 2.0 km || 
|-id=332 bgcolor=#d6d6d6
| 140332 ||  || — || September 20, 2001 || Socorro || LINEAR || — || align=right | 2.7 km || 
|-id=333 bgcolor=#FFC2E0
| 140333 ||  || — || October 10, 2001 || Palomar || NEAT || ATE || align=right data-sort-value="0.51" | 510 m || 
|-id=334 bgcolor=#E9E9E9
| 140334 ||  || — || October 7, 2001 || Palomar || NEAT || — || align=right | 3.3 km || 
|-id=335 bgcolor=#d6d6d6
| 140335 ||  || — || October 7, 2001 || Palomar || NEAT || — || align=right | 4.2 km || 
|-id=336 bgcolor=#d6d6d6
| 140336 ||  || — || October 8, 2001 || Palomar || NEAT || — || align=right | 6.7 km || 
|-id=337 bgcolor=#d6d6d6
| 140337 ||  || — || October 8, 2001 || Palomar || NEAT || KAR || align=right | 1.5 km || 
|-id=338 bgcolor=#E9E9E9
| 140338 ||  || — || October 8, 2001 || Palomar || NEAT || — || align=right | 4.8 km || 
|-id=339 bgcolor=#E9E9E9
| 140339 ||  || — || October 10, 2001 || Palomar || NEAT || — || align=right | 4.2 km || 
|-id=340 bgcolor=#d6d6d6
| 140340 ||  || — || October 11, 2001 || Desert Eagle || W. K. Y. Yeung || LIX || align=right | 8.3 km || 
|-id=341 bgcolor=#fefefe
| 140341 ||  || — || October 11, 2001 || Desert Eagle || W. K. Y. Yeung || — || align=right | 1.5 km || 
|-id=342 bgcolor=#d6d6d6
| 140342 ||  || — || October 9, 2001 || Socorro || LINEAR || TEL || align=right | 2.8 km || 
|-id=343 bgcolor=#E9E9E9
| 140343 ||  || — || October 13, 2001 || Socorro || LINEAR || — || align=right | 3.8 km || 
|-id=344 bgcolor=#d6d6d6
| 140344 ||  || — || October 13, 2001 || Socorro || LINEAR || KOR || align=right | 2.6 km || 
|-id=345 bgcolor=#fefefe
| 140345 ||  || — || October 13, 2001 || Socorro || LINEAR || H || align=right | 1.2 km || 
|-id=346 bgcolor=#d6d6d6
| 140346 ||  || — || October 7, 2001 || Palomar || NEAT || — || align=right | 5.9 km || 
|-id=347 bgcolor=#d6d6d6
| 140347 ||  || — || October 7, 2001 || Palomar || NEAT || — || align=right | 6.1 km || 
|-id=348 bgcolor=#d6d6d6
| 140348 ||  || — || October 13, 2001 || Goodricke-Pigott || R. A. Tucker || 7:4 || align=right | 9.0 km || 
|-id=349 bgcolor=#d6d6d6
| 140349 ||  || — || October 11, 2001 || Socorro || LINEAR || 629 || align=right | 3.7 km || 
|-id=350 bgcolor=#E9E9E9
| 140350 ||  || — || October 11, 2001 || Socorro || LINEAR || MAR || align=right | 2.4 km || 
|-id=351 bgcolor=#d6d6d6
| 140351 ||  || — || October 14, 2001 || Desert Eagle || W. K. Y. Yeung || EOS || align=right | 3.6 km || 
|-id=352 bgcolor=#E9E9E9
| 140352 ||  || — || October 14, 2001 || Desert Eagle || W. K. Y. Yeung || — || align=right | 4.5 km || 
|-id=353 bgcolor=#d6d6d6
| 140353 ||  || — || October 15, 2001 || Goodricke-Pigott || R. A. Tucker || — || align=right | 6.2 km || 
|-id=354 bgcolor=#d6d6d6
| 140354 ||  || — || October 9, 2001 || Socorro || LINEAR || — || align=right | 6.4 km || 
|-id=355 bgcolor=#E9E9E9
| 140355 ||  || — || October 9, 2001 || Socorro || LINEAR || — || align=right | 3.6 km || 
|-id=356 bgcolor=#d6d6d6
| 140356 ||  || — || October 9, 2001 || Socorro || LINEAR || — || align=right | 6.0 km || 
|-id=357 bgcolor=#d6d6d6
| 140357 ||  || — || October 9, 2001 || Socorro || LINEAR || — || align=right | 6.1 km || 
|-id=358 bgcolor=#d6d6d6
| 140358 ||  || — || October 9, 2001 || Socorro || LINEAR || — || align=right | 5.5 km || 
|-id=359 bgcolor=#d6d6d6
| 140359 ||  || — || October 13, 2001 || Socorro || LINEAR || — || align=right | 5.3 km || 
|-id=360 bgcolor=#E9E9E9
| 140360 ||  || — || October 13, 2001 || Socorro || LINEAR || — || align=right | 2.6 km || 
|-id=361 bgcolor=#fefefe
| 140361 ||  || — || October 14, 2001 || Socorro || LINEAR || NYS || align=right | 1.7 km || 
|-id=362 bgcolor=#E9E9E9
| 140362 ||  || — || October 14, 2001 || Socorro || LINEAR || — || align=right | 2.8 km || 
|-id=363 bgcolor=#d6d6d6
| 140363 ||  || — || October 14, 2001 || Socorro || LINEAR || — || align=right | 6.0 km || 
|-id=364 bgcolor=#d6d6d6
| 140364 ||  || — || October 14, 2001 || Socorro || LINEAR || — || align=right | 6.5 km || 
|-id=365 bgcolor=#d6d6d6
| 140365 ||  || — || October 14, 2001 || Socorro || LINEAR || — || align=right | 6.2 km || 
|-id=366 bgcolor=#E9E9E9
| 140366 ||  || — || October 14, 2001 || Socorro || LINEAR || — || align=right | 2.1 km || 
|-id=367 bgcolor=#d6d6d6
| 140367 ||  || — || October 14, 2001 || Socorro || LINEAR || — || align=right | 4.9 km || 
|-id=368 bgcolor=#E9E9E9
| 140368 ||  || — || October 14, 2001 || Socorro || LINEAR || — || align=right | 2.3 km || 
|-id=369 bgcolor=#E9E9E9
| 140369 ||  || — || October 14, 2001 || Socorro || LINEAR || HEN || align=right | 1.9 km || 
|-id=370 bgcolor=#d6d6d6
| 140370 ||  || — || October 14, 2001 || Socorro || LINEAR || — || align=right | 5.5 km || 
|-id=371 bgcolor=#d6d6d6
| 140371 ||  || — || October 14, 2001 || Socorro || LINEAR || TEL || align=right | 2.6 km || 
|-id=372 bgcolor=#d6d6d6
| 140372 ||  || — || October 14, 2001 || Socorro || LINEAR || — || align=right | 5.7 km || 
|-id=373 bgcolor=#d6d6d6
| 140373 ||  || — || October 14, 2001 || Socorro || LINEAR || — || align=right | 6.8 km || 
|-id=374 bgcolor=#d6d6d6
| 140374 ||  || — || October 14, 2001 || Socorro || LINEAR || — || align=right | 6.2 km || 
|-id=375 bgcolor=#d6d6d6
| 140375 ||  || — || October 14, 2001 || Socorro || LINEAR || EOS || align=right | 4.6 km || 
|-id=376 bgcolor=#d6d6d6
| 140376 ||  || — || October 14, 2001 || Socorro || LINEAR || — || align=right | 6.2 km || 
|-id=377 bgcolor=#d6d6d6
| 140377 ||  || — || October 14, 2001 || Socorro || LINEAR || EOS || align=right | 4.2 km || 
|-id=378 bgcolor=#d6d6d6
| 140378 ||  || — || October 14, 2001 || Socorro || LINEAR || TIR || align=right | 6.2 km || 
|-id=379 bgcolor=#d6d6d6
| 140379 ||  || — || October 14, 2001 || Socorro || LINEAR || ALA || align=right | 7.1 km || 
|-id=380 bgcolor=#d6d6d6
| 140380 ||  || — || October 14, 2001 || Needville || Needville Obs. || — || align=right | 4.1 km || 
|-id=381 bgcolor=#fefefe
| 140381 ||  || — || October 15, 2001 || Socorro || LINEAR || H || align=right | 2.7 km || 
|-id=382 bgcolor=#d6d6d6
| 140382 ||  || — || October 14, 2001 || Cima Ekar || ADAS || EOS || align=right | 3.3 km || 
|-id=383 bgcolor=#d6d6d6
| 140383 ||  || — || October 14, 2001 || Desert Eagle || W. K. Y. Yeung || — || align=right | 5.9 km || 
|-id=384 bgcolor=#fefefe
| 140384 ||  || — || October 15, 2001 || Socorro || LINEAR || H || align=right data-sort-value="0.89" | 890 m || 
|-id=385 bgcolor=#d6d6d6
| 140385 ||  || — || October 11, 2001 || Socorro || LINEAR || CHA || align=right | 3.7 km || 
|-id=386 bgcolor=#E9E9E9
| 140386 ||  || — || October 13, 2001 || Socorro || LINEAR || DOR || align=right | 6.0 km || 
|-id=387 bgcolor=#d6d6d6
| 140387 ||  || — || October 13, 2001 || Socorro || LINEAR || — || align=right | 3.9 km || 
|-id=388 bgcolor=#E9E9E9
| 140388 ||  || — || October 13, 2001 || Socorro || LINEAR || — || align=right | 2.4 km || 
|-id=389 bgcolor=#E9E9E9
| 140389 ||  || — || October 14, 2001 || Socorro || LINEAR || — || align=right | 5.2 km || 
|-id=390 bgcolor=#d6d6d6
| 140390 ||  || — || October 14, 2001 || Socorro || LINEAR || — || align=right | 4.4 km || 
|-id=391 bgcolor=#d6d6d6
| 140391 ||  || — || October 15, 2001 || Socorro || LINEAR || — || align=right | 5.0 km || 
|-id=392 bgcolor=#E9E9E9
| 140392 ||  || — || October 13, 2001 || Socorro || LINEAR || AGN || align=right | 2.2 km || 
|-id=393 bgcolor=#d6d6d6
| 140393 ||  || — || October 13, 2001 || Socorro || LINEAR || HYG || align=right | 5.0 km || 
|-id=394 bgcolor=#d6d6d6
| 140394 ||  || — || October 13, 2001 || Socorro || LINEAR || — || align=right | 4.1 km || 
|-id=395 bgcolor=#d6d6d6
| 140395 ||  || — || October 13, 2001 || Socorro || LINEAR || BRA || align=right | 3.7 km || 
|-id=396 bgcolor=#d6d6d6
| 140396 ||  || — || October 13, 2001 || Socorro || LINEAR || HYG || align=right | 4.9 km || 
|-id=397 bgcolor=#d6d6d6
| 140397 ||  || — || October 13, 2001 || Socorro || LINEAR || THM || align=right | 4.2 km || 
|-id=398 bgcolor=#d6d6d6
| 140398 ||  || — || October 13, 2001 || Socorro || LINEAR || TEL || align=right | 3.4 km || 
|-id=399 bgcolor=#d6d6d6
| 140399 ||  || — || October 13, 2001 || Socorro || LINEAR || THM || align=right | 5.6 km || 
|-id=400 bgcolor=#E9E9E9
| 140400 ||  || — || October 13, 2001 || Socorro || LINEAR || — || align=right | 2.3 km || 
|}

140401–140500 

|-bgcolor=#d6d6d6
| 140401 ||  || — || October 13, 2001 || Socorro || LINEAR || — || align=right | 6.7 km || 
|-id=402 bgcolor=#d6d6d6
| 140402 ||  || — || October 13, 2001 || Socorro || LINEAR || — || align=right | 4.5 km || 
|-id=403 bgcolor=#E9E9E9
| 140403 ||  || — || October 13, 2001 || Socorro || LINEAR || — || align=right | 2.5 km || 
|-id=404 bgcolor=#fefefe
| 140404 ||  || — || October 13, 2001 || Socorro || LINEAR || — || align=right | 1.2 km || 
|-id=405 bgcolor=#d6d6d6
| 140405 ||  || — || October 13, 2001 || Socorro || LINEAR || KOR || align=right | 2.4 km || 
|-id=406 bgcolor=#d6d6d6
| 140406 ||  || — || October 13, 2001 || Socorro || LINEAR || — || align=right | 5.1 km || 
|-id=407 bgcolor=#d6d6d6
| 140407 ||  || — || October 13, 2001 || Socorro || LINEAR || — || align=right | 5.0 km || 
|-id=408 bgcolor=#d6d6d6
| 140408 ||  || — || October 13, 2001 || Socorro || LINEAR || — || align=right | 7.2 km || 
|-id=409 bgcolor=#d6d6d6
| 140409 ||  || — || October 13, 2001 || Socorro || LINEAR || — || align=right | 5.6 km || 
|-id=410 bgcolor=#d6d6d6
| 140410 ||  || — || October 14, 2001 || Socorro || LINEAR || — || align=right | 3.8 km || 
|-id=411 bgcolor=#E9E9E9
| 140411 ||  || — || October 14, 2001 || Socorro || LINEAR || — || align=right | 2.8 km || 
|-id=412 bgcolor=#E9E9E9
| 140412 ||  || — || October 14, 2001 || Socorro || LINEAR || WIT || align=right | 1.7 km || 
|-id=413 bgcolor=#E9E9E9
| 140413 ||  || — || October 14, 2001 || Socorro || LINEAR || HEN || align=right | 1.7 km || 
|-id=414 bgcolor=#d6d6d6
| 140414 ||  || — || October 14, 2001 || Socorro || LINEAR || EOS || align=right | 3.4 km || 
|-id=415 bgcolor=#d6d6d6
| 140415 ||  || — || October 14, 2001 || Socorro || LINEAR || — || align=right | 5.7 km || 
|-id=416 bgcolor=#d6d6d6
| 140416 ||  || — || October 14, 2001 || Socorro || LINEAR || ALA || align=right | 7.4 km || 
|-id=417 bgcolor=#d6d6d6
| 140417 ||  || — || October 14, 2001 || Socorro || LINEAR || — || align=right | 4.8 km || 
|-id=418 bgcolor=#d6d6d6
| 140418 ||  || — || October 14, 2001 || Socorro || LINEAR || — || align=right | 4.2 km || 
|-id=419 bgcolor=#E9E9E9
| 140419 ||  || — || October 14, 2001 || Socorro || LINEAR || — || align=right | 3.8 km || 
|-id=420 bgcolor=#d6d6d6
| 140420 ||  || — || October 14, 2001 || Socorro || LINEAR || EOS || align=right | 3.6 km || 
|-id=421 bgcolor=#d6d6d6
| 140421 ||  || — || October 14, 2001 || Socorro || LINEAR || — || align=right | 4.4 km || 
|-id=422 bgcolor=#E9E9E9
| 140422 ||  || — || October 14, 2001 || Socorro || LINEAR || — || align=right | 3.7 km || 
|-id=423 bgcolor=#d6d6d6
| 140423 ||  || — || October 14, 2001 || Socorro || LINEAR || EOS || align=right | 4.0 km || 
|-id=424 bgcolor=#d6d6d6
| 140424 ||  || — || October 14, 2001 || Socorro || LINEAR || CHA || align=right | 3.7 km || 
|-id=425 bgcolor=#d6d6d6
| 140425 ||  || — || October 14, 2001 || Socorro || LINEAR || — || align=right | 4.3 km || 
|-id=426 bgcolor=#E9E9E9
| 140426 ||  || — || October 14, 2001 || Socorro || LINEAR || — || align=right | 3.5 km || 
|-id=427 bgcolor=#E9E9E9
| 140427 ||  || — || October 14, 2001 || Socorro || LINEAR || INO || align=right | 3.7 km || 
|-id=428 bgcolor=#d6d6d6
| 140428 ||  || — || October 14, 2001 || Socorro || LINEAR || — || align=right | 5.9 km || 
|-id=429 bgcolor=#d6d6d6
| 140429 ||  || — || October 14, 2001 || Socorro || LINEAR || — || align=right | 5.1 km || 
|-id=430 bgcolor=#d6d6d6
| 140430 ||  || — || October 15, 2001 || Socorro || LINEAR || — || align=right | 3.4 km || 
|-id=431 bgcolor=#d6d6d6
| 140431 ||  || — || October 15, 2001 || Socorro || LINEAR || EOS || align=right | 3.5 km || 
|-id=432 bgcolor=#E9E9E9
| 140432 ||  || — || October 15, 2001 || Socorro || LINEAR || GEF || align=right | 2.6 km || 
|-id=433 bgcolor=#d6d6d6
| 140433 ||  || — || October 15, 2001 || Socorro || LINEAR || — || align=right | 6.3 km || 
|-id=434 bgcolor=#d6d6d6
| 140434 ||  || — || October 15, 2001 || Socorro || LINEAR || — || align=right | 5.3 km || 
|-id=435 bgcolor=#d6d6d6
| 140435 ||  || — || October 15, 2001 || Desert Eagle || W. K. Y. Yeung || — || align=right | 5.4 km || 
|-id=436 bgcolor=#d6d6d6
| 140436 ||  || — || October 13, 2001 || Socorro || LINEAR || EOS || align=right | 3.6 km || 
|-id=437 bgcolor=#E9E9E9
| 140437 ||  || — || October 13, 2001 || Socorro || LINEAR || — || align=right | 6.6 km || 
|-id=438 bgcolor=#d6d6d6
| 140438 ||  || — || October 14, 2001 || Socorro || LINEAR || TRP || align=right | 5.1 km || 
|-id=439 bgcolor=#E9E9E9
| 140439 ||  || — || October 14, 2001 || Socorro || LINEAR || — || align=right | 3.1 km || 
|-id=440 bgcolor=#d6d6d6
| 140440 ||  || — || October 14, 2001 || Socorro || LINEAR || — || align=right | 5.1 km || 
|-id=441 bgcolor=#d6d6d6
| 140441 ||  || — || October 14, 2001 || Socorro || LINEAR || — || align=right | 7.5 km || 
|-id=442 bgcolor=#d6d6d6
| 140442 ||  || — || October 14, 2001 || Socorro || LINEAR || — || align=right | 6.6 km || 
|-id=443 bgcolor=#E9E9E9
| 140443 ||  || — || October 14, 2001 || Socorro || LINEAR || — || align=right | 3.9 km || 
|-id=444 bgcolor=#d6d6d6
| 140444 ||  || — || October 14, 2001 || Socorro || LINEAR || — || align=right | 4.8 km || 
|-id=445 bgcolor=#d6d6d6
| 140445 ||  || — || October 14, 2001 || Socorro || LINEAR || — || align=right | 6.4 km || 
|-id=446 bgcolor=#d6d6d6
| 140446 ||  || — || October 15, 2001 || Socorro || LINEAR || — || align=right | 8.0 km || 
|-id=447 bgcolor=#d6d6d6
| 140447 ||  || — || October 15, 2001 || Socorro || LINEAR || — || align=right | 4.9 km || 
|-id=448 bgcolor=#E9E9E9
| 140448 ||  || — || October 15, 2001 || Socorro || LINEAR || ADE || align=right | 4.5 km || 
|-id=449 bgcolor=#d6d6d6
| 140449 ||  || — || October 15, 2001 || Socorro || LINEAR || — || align=right | 4.2 km || 
|-id=450 bgcolor=#d6d6d6
| 140450 ||  || — || October 15, 2001 || Socorro || LINEAR || — || align=right | 5.1 km || 
|-id=451 bgcolor=#d6d6d6
| 140451 ||  || — || October 15, 2001 || Socorro || LINEAR || — || align=right | 5.6 km || 
|-id=452 bgcolor=#d6d6d6
| 140452 ||  || — || October 15, 2001 || Socorro || LINEAR || NAE || align=right | 6.3 km || 
|-id=453 bgcolor=#d6d6d6
| 140453 ||  || — || October 12, 2001 || Haleakala || NEAT || — || align=right | 5.1 km || 
|-id=454 bgcolor=#d6d6d6
| 140454 ||  || — || October 12, 2001 || Haleakala || NEAT || — || align=right | 5.4 km || 
|-id=455 bgcolor=#d6d6d6
| 140455 ||  || — || October 12, 2001 || Haleakala || NEAT || EOS || align=right | 4.3 km || 
|-id=456 bgcolor=#d6d6d6
| 140456 ||  || — || October 12, 2001 || Haleakala || NEAT || — || align=right | 5.6 km || 
|-id=457 bgcolor=#d6d6d6
| 140457 ||  || — || October 13, 2001 || Kitt Peak || Spacewatch || KOR || align=right | 2.2 km || 
|-id=458 bgcolor=#d6d6d6
| 140458 ||  || — || October 11, 2001 || Bergisch Gladbach || W. Bickel || EOS || align=right | 3.1 km || 
|-id=459 bgcolor=#E9E9E9
| 140459 ||  || — || October 12, 2001 || Anderson Mesa || LONEOS || — || align=right | 2.1 km || 
|-id=460 bgcolor=#d6d6d6
| 140460 ||  || — || October 12, 2001 || Anderson Mesa || LONEOS || EOS || align=right | 2.6 km || 
|-id=461 bgcolor=#fefefe
| 140461 ||  || — || October 15, 2001 || Socorro || LINEAR || H || align=right data-sort-value="0.89" | 890 m || 
|-id=462 bgcolor=#d6d6d6
| 140462 ||  || — || October 10, 2001 || Palomar || NEAT || — || align=right | 6.3 km || 
|-id=463 bgcolor=#E9E9E9
| 140463 ||  || — || October 14, 2001 || Kitt Peak || Spacewatch || HEN || align=right | 1.8 km || 
|-id=464 bgcolor=#d6d6d6
| 140464 ||  || — || October 14, 2001 || Kitt Peak || Spacewatch || — || align=right | 3.7 km || 
|-id=465 bgcolor=#d6d6d6
| 140465 ||  || — || October 15, 2001 || Kitt Peak || Spacewatch || — || align=right | 2.5 km || 
|-id=466 bgcolor=#E9E9E9
| 140466 ||  || — || October 10, 2001 || Palomar || NEAT || — || align=right | 4.7 km || 
|-id=467 bgcolor=#d6d6d6
| 140467 ||  || — || October 11, 2001 || Palomar || NEAT || TEL || align=right | 2.8 km || 
|-id=468 bgcolor=#d6d6d6
| 140468 ||  || — || October 12, 2001 || Haleakala || NEAT || — || align=right | 6.1 km || 
|-id=469 bgcolor=#d6d6d6
| 140469 ||  || — || October 12, 2001 || Haleakala || NEAT || — || align=right | 6.8 km || 
|-id=470 bgcolor=#E9E9E9
| 140470 ||  || — || October 13, 2001 || Palomar || NEAT || — || align=right | 5.4 km || 
|-id=471 bgcolor=#d6d6d6
| 140471 ||  || — || October 13, 2001 || Palomar || NEAT || EUP || align=right | 8.8 km || 
|-id=472 bgcolor=#d6d6d6
| 140472 ||  || — || October 13, 2001 || Palomar || NEAT || EOS || align=right | 3.2 km || 
|-id=473 bgcolor=#d6d6d6
| 140473 ||  || — || October 13, 2001 || Palomar || NEAT || — || align=right | 5.1 km || 
|-id=474 bgcolor=#d6d6d6
| 140474 ||  || — || October 13, 2001 || Palomar || NEAT || — || align=right | 6.1 km || 
|-id=475 bgcolor=#d6d6d6
| 140475 ||  || — || October 14, 2001 || Palomar || NEAT || EOS || align=right | 3.9 km || 
|-id=476 bgcolor=#E9E9E9
| 140476 ||  || — || October 14, 2001 || Palomar || NEAT || — || align=right | 5.5 km || 
|-id=477 bgcolor=#d6d6d6
| 140477 ||  || — || October 14, 2001 || Palomar || NEAT || — || align=right | 4.6 km || 
|-id=478 bgcolor=#E9E9E9
| 140478 ||  || — || October 10, 2001 || Palomar || NEAT || — || align=right | 2.4 km || 
|-id=479 bgcolor=#E9E9E9
| 140479 ||  || — || October 10, 2001 || Palomar || NEAT || — || align=right | 3.8 km || 
|-id=480 bgcolor=#E9E9E9
| 140480 ||  || — || October 10, 2001 || Palomar || NEAT || NEM || align=right | 3.3 km || 
|-id=481 bgcolor=#d6d6d6
| 140481 ||  || — || October 10, 2001 || Palomar || NEAT || — || align=right | 5.3 km || 
|-id=482 bgcolor=#E9E9E9
| 140482 ||  || — || October 10, 2001 || Palomar || NEAT || — || align=right | 2.9 km || 
|-id=483 bgcolor=#E9E9E9
| 140483 ||  || — || October 10, 2001 || Palomar || NEAT || — || align=right | 2.9 km || 
|-id=484 bgcolor=#d6d6d6
| 140484 ||  || — || October 10, 2001 || Palomar || NEAT || BRA || align=right | 3.8 km || 
|-id=485 bgcolor=#E9E9E9
| 140485 ||  || — || October 10, 2001 || Palomar || NEAT || RAF || align=right | 1.9 km || 
|-id=486 bgcolor=#E9E9E9
| 140486 ||  || — || October 10, 2001 || Palomar || NEAT || — || align=right | 1.9 km || 
|-id=487 bgcolor=#E9E9E9
| 140487 ||  || — || October 10, 2001 || Palomar || NEAT || GEF || align=right | 2.2 km || 
|-id=488 bgcolor=#E9E9E9
| 140488 ||  || — || October 10, 2001 || Palomar || NEAT || — || align=right | 2.4 km || 
|-id=489 bgcolor=#E9E9E9
| 140489 ||  || — || October 10, 2001 || Palomar || NEAT || MRX || align=right | 1.9 km || 
|-id=490 bgcolor=#E9E9E9
| 140490 ||  || — || October 10, 2001 || Palomar || NEAT || HOF || align=right | 4.8 km || 
|-id=491 bgcolor=#E9E9E9
| 140491 ||  || — || October 10, 2001 || Palomar || NEAT || — || align=right | 2.0 km || 
|-id=492 bgcolor=#E9E9E9
| 140492 ||  || — || October 10, 2001 || Palomar || NEAT || — || align=right | 2.0 km || 
|-id=493 bgcolor=#d6d6d6
| 140493 ||  || — || October 10, 2001 || Palomar || NEAT || EOS || align=right | 3.7 km || 
|-id=494 bgcolor=#d6d6d6
| 140494 ||  || — || October 10, 2001 || Palomar || NEAT || — || align=right | 5.3 km || 
|-id=495 bgcolor=#E9E9E9
| 140495 ||  || — || October 11, 2001 || Palomar || NEAT || — || align=right | 4.2 km || 
|-id=496 bgcolor=#d6d6d6
| 140496 ||  || — || October 13, 2001 || Palomar || NEAT || — || align=right | 5.3 km || 
|-id=497 bgcolor=#d6d6d6
| 140497 ||  || — || October 13, 2001 || Palomar || NEAT || — || align=right | 7.0 km || 
|-id=498 bgcolor=#E9E9E9
| 140498 ||  || — || October 14, 2001 || Kitt Peak || Spacewatch || — || align=right | 4.0 km || 
|-id=499 bgcolor=#E9E9E9
| 140499 ||  || — || October 14, 2001 || Kitt Peak || Spacewatch || HOF || align=right | 3.1 km || 
|-id=500 bgcolor=#d6d6d6
| 140500 ||  || — || October 10, 2001 || Palomar || NEAT || — || align=right | 5.3 km || 
|}

140501–140600 

|-bgcolor=#E9E9E9
| 140501 ||  || — || October 11, 2001 || Palomar || NEAT || PAD || align=right | 2.4 km || 
|-id=502 bgcolor=#d6d6d6
| 140502 ||  || — || October 15, 2001 || Kitt Peak || Spacewatch || — || align=right | 5.7 km || 
|-id=503 bgcolor=#d6d6d6
| 140503 ||  || — || October 15, 2001 || Kitt Peak || Spacewatch || KOR || align=right | 2.2 km || 
|-id=504 bgcolor=#E9E9E9
| 140504 ||  || — || October 11, 2001 || Palomar || NEAT || HOF || align=right | 2.6 km || 
|-id=505 bgcolor=#E9E9E9
| 140505 ||  || — || October 11, 2001 || Palomar || NEAT || CLO || align=right | 1.7 km || 
|-id=506 bgcolor=#E9E9E9
| 140506 ||  || — || October 11, 2001 || Palomar || NEAT || — || align=right | 3.3 km || 
|-id=507 bgcolor=#d6d6d6
| 140507 ||  || — || October 11, 2001 || Palomar || NEAT || — || align=right | 5.0 km || 
|-id=508 bgcolor=#d6d6d6
| 140508 ||  || — || October 13, 2001 || Socorro || LINEAR || — || align=right | 5.3 km || 
|-id=509 bgcolor=#d6d6d6
| 140509 ||  || — || October 14, 2001 || Socorro || LINEAR || HYG || align=right | 5.4 km || 
|-id=510 bgcolor=#d6d6d6
| 140510 ||  || — || October 14, 2001 || Socorro || LINEAR || URS || align=right | 6.4 km || 
|-id=511 bgcolor=#d6d6d6
| 140511 ||  || — || October 15, 2001 || Socorro || LINEAR || — || align=right | 6.5 km || 
|-id=512 bgcolor=#d6d6d6
| 140512 ||  || — || October 15, 2001 || Socorro || LINEAR || — || align=right | 6.2 km || 
|-id=513 bgcolor=#d6d6d6
| 140513 ||  || — || October 15, 2001 || Socorro || LINEAR || — || align=right | 5.1 km || 
|-id=514 bgcolor=#d6d6d6
| 140514 ||  || — || October 15, 2001 || Socorro || LINEAR || — || align=right | 4.6 km || 
|-id=515 bgcolor=#d6d6d6
| 140515 ||  || — || October 15, 2001 || Socorro || LINEAR || EOS || align=right | 4.0 km || 
|-id=516 bgcolor=#d6d6d6
| 140516 ||  || — || October 15, 2001 || Socorro || LINEAR || — || align=right | 5.0 km || 
|-id=517 bgcolor=#d6d6d6
| 140517 ||  || — || October 15, 2001 || Socorro || LINEAR || EOS || align=right | 5.3 km || 
|-id=518 bgcolor=#E9E9E9
| 140518 ||  || — || October 15, 2001 || Socorro || LINEAR || — || align=right | 5.8 km || 
|-id=519 bgcolor=#d6d6d6
| 140519 ||  || — || October 15, 2001 || Socorro || LINEAR || — || align=right | 5.4 km || 
|-id=520 bgcolor=#d6d6d6
| 140520 ||  || — || October 13, 2001 || Palomar || NEAT || — || align=right | 5.3 km || 
|-id=521 bgcolor=#d6d6d6
| 140521 ||  || — || October 13, 2001 || Palomar || NEAT || — || align=right | 5.5 km || 
|-id=522 bgcolor=#d6d6d6
| 140522 ||  || — || October 15, 2001 || Palomar || NEAT || — || align=right | 3.5 km || 
|-id=523 bgcolor=#d6d6d6
| 140523 ||  || — || October 15, 2001 || Palomar || NEAT || — || align=right | 6.0 km || 
|-id=524 bgcolor=#E9E9E9
| 140524 ||  || — || October 13, 2001 || Anderson Mesa || LONEOS || ADE || align=right | 3.5 km || 
|-id=525 bgcolor=#d6d6d6
| 140525 ||  || — || October 13, 2001 || Socorro || LINEAR || SAN || align=right | 2.9 km || 
|-id=526 bgcolor=#d6d6d6
| 140526 ||  || — || October 13, 2001 || Socorro || LINEAR || — || align=right | 4.7 km || 
|-id=527 bgcolor=#d6d6d6
| 140527 ||  || — || October 14, 2001 || Socorro || LINEAR || 628 || align=right | 3.2 km || 
|-id=528 bgcolor=#E9E9E9
| 140528 ||  || — || October 15, 2001 || Socorro || LINEAR || — || align=right | 4.3 km || 
|-id=529 bgcolor=#d6d6d6
| 140529 ||  || — || October 14, 2001 || Socorro || LINEAR || — || align=right | 4.9 km || 
|-id=530 bgcolor=#d6d6d6
| 140530 ||  || — || October 14, 2001 || Socorro || LINEAR || EOS || align=right | 2.8 km || 
|-id=531 bgcolor=#d6d6d6
| 140531 ||  || — || October 14, 2001 || Socorro || LINEAR || — || align=right | 3.7 km || 
|-id=532 bgcolor=#E9E9E9
| 140532 ||  || — || October 14, 2001 || Socorro || LINEAR || — || align=right | 4.7 km || 
|-id=533 bgcolor=#d6d6d6
| 140533 ||  || — || October 14, 2001 || Socorro || LINEAR || — || align=right | 4.2 km || 
|-id=534 bgcolor=#d6d6d6
| 140534 ||  || — || October 14, 2001 || Socorro || LINEAR || — || align=right | 4.7 km || 
|-id=535 bgcolor=#d6d6d6
| 140535 ||  || — || October 14, 2001 || Socorro || LINEAR || — || align=right | 6.7 km || 
|-id=536 bgcolor=#d6d6d6
| 140536 ||  || — || October 14, 2001 || Socorro || LINEAR || — || align=right | 5.2 km || 
|-id=537 bgcolor=#d6d6d6
| 140537 ||  || — || October 14, 2001 || Socorro || LINEAR || — || align=right | 5.9 km || 
|-id=538 bgcolor=#d6d6d6
| 140538 ||  || — || October 14, 2001 || Socorro || LINEAR || BRA || align=right | 4.1 km || 
|-id=539 bgcolor=#E9E9E9
| 140539 ||  || — || October 14, 2001 || Socorro || LINEAR || WIT || align=right | 1.4 km || 
|-id=540 bgcolor=#d6d6d6
| 140540 ||  || — || October 14, 2001 || Socorro || LINEAR || — || align=right | 4.4 km || 
|-id=541 bgcolor=#E9E9E9
| 140541 ||  || — || October 14, 2001 || Socorro || LINEAR || MRX || align=right | 1.8 km || 
|-id=542 bgcolor=#d6d6d6
| 140542 ||  || — || October 14, 2001 || Socorro || LINEAR || — || align=right | 3.3 km || 
|-id=543 bgcolor=#fefefe
| 140543 ||  || — || October 14, 2001 || Socorro || LINEAR || — || align=right | 1.8 km || 
|-id=544 bgcolor=#E9E9E9
| 140544 ||  || — || October 14, 2001 || Socorro || LINEAR || — || align=right | 2.0 km || 
|-id=545 bgcolor=#d6d6d6
| 140545 ||  || — || October 15, 2001 || Socorro || LINEAR || EOS || align=right | 2.8 km || 
|-id=546 bgcolor=#d6d6d6
| 140546 ||  || — || October 15, 2001 || Palomar || NEAT || — || align=right | 5.4 km || 
|-id=547 bgcolor=#d6d6d6
| 140547 ||  || — || October 15, 2001 || Palomar || NEAT || EOS || align=right | 4.0 km || 
|-id=548 bgcolor=#E9E9E9
| 140548 ||  || — || October 15, 2001 || Palomar || NEAT || — || align=right | 3.1 km || 
|-id=549 bgcolor=#d6d6d6
| 140549 ||  || — || October 11, 2001 || Socorro || LINEAR || EOS || align=right | 3.8 km || 
|-id=550 bgcolor=#d6d6d6
| 140550 ||  || — || October 11, 2001 || Socorro || LINEAR || — || align=right | 5.7 km || 
|-id=551 bgcolor=#E9E9E9
| 140551 ||  || — || October 11, 2001 || Socorro || LINEAR || WIT || align=right | 1.7 km || 
|-id=552 bgcolor=#d6d6d6
| 140552 ||  || — || October 11, 2001 || Socorro || LINEAR || — || align=right | 5.0 km || 
|-id=553 bgcolor=#d6d6d6
| 140553 ||  || — || October 11, 2001 || Socorro || LINEAR || — || align=right | 3.3 km || 
|-id=554 bgcolor=#d6d6d6
| 140554 ||  || — || October 11, 2001 || Socorro || LINEAR || — || align=right | 6.9 km || 
|-id=555 bgcolor=#E9E9E9
| 140555 ||  || — || October 11, 2001 || Socorro || LINEAR || — || align=right | 3.3 km || 
|-id=556 bgcolor=#E9E9E9
| 140556 ||  || — || October 11, 2001 || Socorro || LINEAR || — || align=right | 4.2 km || 
|-id=557 bgcolor=#E9E9E9
| 140557 ||  || — || October 11, 2001 || Socorro || LINEAR || PAD || align=right | 4.4 km || 
|-id=558 bgcolor=#d6d6d6
| 140558 ||  || — || October 11, 2001 || Socorro || LINEAR || EOS || align=right | 3.2 km || 
|-id=559 bgcolor=#d6d6d6
| 140559 ||  || — || October 11, 2001 || Socorro || LINEAR || — || align=right | 5.8 km || 
|-id=560 bgcolor=#d6d6d6
| 140560 ||  || — || October 11, 2001 || Socorro || LINEAR || EOS || align=right | 3.3 km || 
|-id=561 bgcolor=#d6d6d6
| 140561 ||  || — || October 11, 2001 || Palomar || NEAT || — || align=right | 3.1 km || 
|-id=562 bgcolor=#E9E9E9
| 140562 ||  || — || October 11, 2001 || Palomar || NEAT || — || align=right | 3.6 km || 
|-id=563 bgcolor=#d6d6d6
| 140563 ||  || — || October 12, 2001 || Haleakala || NEAT || — || align=right | 7.6 km || 
|-id=564 bgcolor=#E9E9E9
| 140564 ||  || — || October 13, 2001 || Palomar || NEAT || HNS || align=right | 2.0 km || 
|-id=565 bgcolor=#E9E9E9
| 140565 ||  || — || October 13, 2001 || Palomar || NEAT || — || align=right | 4.7 km || 
|-id=566 bgcolor=#d6d6d6
| 140566 ||  || — || October 13, 2001 || Palomar || NEAT || — || align=right | 5.5 km || 
|-id=567 bgcolor=#d6d6d6
| 140567 ||  || — || October 13, 2001 || Palomar || NEAT || EOS || align=right | 3.7 km || 
|-id=568 bgcolor=#d6d6d6
| 140568 ||  || — || October 13, 2001 || Anderson Mesa || LONEOS || CRO || align=right | 7.6 km || 
|-id=569 bgcolor=#d6d6d6
| 140569 ||  || — || October 13, 2001 || Anderson Mesa || LONEOS || — || align=right | 5.1 km || 
|-id=570 bgcolor=#d6d6d6
| 140570 ||  || — || October 13, 2001 || Kitt Peak || Spacewatch || — || align=right | 4.9 km || 
|-id=571 bgcolor=#d6d6d6
| 140571 ||  || — || October 13, 2001 || Palomar || NEAT || BRA || align=right | 2.9 km || 
|-id=572 bgcolor=#E9E9E9
| 140572 ||  || — || October 13, 2001 || Palomar || NEAT || — || align=right | 4.3 km || 
|-id=573 bgcolor=#d6d6d6
| 140573 ||  || — || October 13, 2001 || Palomar || NEAT || — || align=right | 3.7 km || 
|-id=574 bgcolor=#d6d6d6
| 140574 ||  || — || October 13, 2001 || Palomar || NEAT || — || align=right | 6.4 km || 
|-id=575 bgcolor=#d6d6d6
| 140575 ||  || — || October 14, 2001 || Socorro || LINEAR || CHA || align=right | 3.9 km || 
|-id=576 bgcolor=#d6d6d6
| 140576 ||  || — || October 14, 2001 || Socorro || LINEAR || — || align=right | 5.4 km || 
|-id=577 bgcolor=#d6d6d6
| 140577 ||  || — || October 14, 2001 || Anderson Mesa || LONEOS || — || align=right | 7.2 km || 
|-id=578 bgcolor=#d6d6d6
| 140578 ||  || — || October 14, 2001 || Socorro || LINEAR || — || align=right | 6.0 km || 
|-id=579 bgcolor=#E9E9E9
| 140579 ||  || — || October 14, 2001 || Palomar || NEAT || KON || align=right | 5.0 km || 
|-id=580 bgcolor=#E9E9E9
| 140580 ||  || — || October 14, 2001 || Socorro || LINEAR || — || align=right | 5.2 km || 
|-id=581 bgcolor=#d6d6d6
| 140581 ||  || — || October 14, 2001 || Socorro || LINEAR || CHA || align=right | 3.2 km || 
|-id=582 bgcolor=#d6d6d6
| 140582 ||  || — || October 14, 2001 || Anderson Mesa || LONEOS || EUP || align=right | 6.4 km || 
|-id=583 bgcolor=#d6d6d6
| 140583 ||  || — || October 14, 2001 || Palomar || NEAT || EOS || align=right | 4.3 km || 
|-id=584 bgcolor=#E9E9E9
| 140584 ||  || — || October 14, 2001 || Palomar || NEAT || — || align=right | 2.3 km || 
|-id=585 bgcolor=#fefefe
| 140585 ||  || — || October 15, 2001 || Palomar || NEAT || — || align=right | 1.6 km || 
|-id=586 bgcolor=#E9E9E9
| 140586 ||  || — || October 15, 2001 || Kitt Peak || Spacewatch || — || align=right | 2.6 km || 
|-id=587 bgcolor=#d6d6d6
| 140587 ||  || — || October 15, 2001 || Socorro || LINEAR || — || align=right | 6.8 km || 
|-id=588 bgcolor=#E9E9E9
| 140588 ||  || — || October 15, 2001 || Palomar || NEAT || GEF || align=right | 2.9 km || 
|-id=589 bgcolor=#d6d6d6
| 140589 ||  || — || October 15, 2001 || Palomar || NEAT || — || align=right | 3.9 km || 
|-id=590 bgcolor=#E9E9E9
| 140590 ||  || — || October 15, 2001 || Kitt Peak || Spacewatch || AST || align=right | 2.1 km || 
|-id=591 bgcolor=#d6d6d6
| 140591 ||  || — || October 15, 2001 || Palomar || NEAT || — || align=right | 6.5 km || 
|-id=592 bgcolor=#E9E9E9
| 140592 ||  || — || October 15, 2001 || Haleakala || NEAT || GEF || align=right | 2.1 km || 
|-id=593 bgcolor=#E9E9E9
| 140593 ||  || — || October 15, 2001 || Haleakala || NEAT || — || align=right | 6.0 km || 
|-id=594 bgcolor=#d6d6d6
| 140594 ||  || — || October 15, 2001 || Palomar || NEAT || — || align=right | 4.4 km || 
|-id=595 bgcolor=#d6d6d6
| 140595 ||  || — || October 15, 2001 || Palomar || NEAT || — || align=right | 5.6 km || 
|-id=596 bgcolor=#d6d6d6
| 140596 ||  || — || October 15, 2001 || Haleakala || NEAT || — || align=right | 8.2 km || 
|-id=597 bgcolor=#E9E9E9
| 140597 ||  || — || October 13, 2001 || Palomar || NEAT || — || align=right | 4.0 km || 
|-id=598 bgcolor=#E9E9E9
| 140598 ||  || — || October 14, 2001 || Palomar || NEAT || — || align=right | 3.9 km || 
|-id=599 bgcolor=#d6d6d6
| 140599 ||  || — || October 15, 2001 || Palomar || NEAT || — || align=right | 4.0 km || 
|-id=600 bgcolor=#E9E9E9
| 140600 ||  || — || October 15, 2001 || Palomar || NEAT || SHF || align=right | 2.8 km || 
|}

140601–140700 

|-bgcolor=#d6d6d6
| 140601 ||  || — || October 15, 2001 || Palomar || NEAT || EOS || align=right | 3.7 km || 
|-id=602 bgcolor=#d6d6d6
| 140602 Berlind ||  ||  || October 14, 2001 || Apache Point || SDSS || KAR || align=right | 1.6 km || 
|-id=603 bgcolor=#E9E9E9
| 140603 || 2001 UQ || — || October 18, 2001 || Emerald Lane || L. Ball || HOF || align=right | 5.0 km || 
|-id=604 bgcolor=#d6d6d6
| 140604 ||  || — || October 16, 2001 || Socorro || LINEAR || ALA || align=right | 6.7 km || 
|-id=605 bgcolor=#E9E9E9
| 140605 ||  || — || October 16, 2001 || Socorro || LINEAR || — || align=right | 5.0 km || 
|-id=606 bgcolor=#E9E9E9
| 140606 ||  || — || October 16, 2001 || Socorro || LINEAR || — || align=right | 2.9 km || 
|-id=607 bgcolor=#d6d6d6
| 140607 ||  || — || October 17, 2001 || Desert Eagle || W. K. Y. Yeung || — || align=right | 4.8 km || 
|-id=608 bgcolor=#fefefe
| 140608 ||  || — || October 17, 2001 || Desert Eagle || W. K. Y. Yeung || V || align=right | 1.5 km || 
|-id=609 bgcolor=#d6d6d6
| 140609 ||  || — || October 17, 2001 || Desert Eagle || W. K. Y. Yeung || THM || align=right | 5.0 km || 
|-id=610 bgcolor=#fefefe
| 140610 ||  || — || October 19, 2001 || Bisei SG Center || BATTeRS || PHO || align=right | 2.9 km || 
|-id=611 bgcolor=#d6d6d6
| 140611 ||  || — || October 17, 2001 || Desert Eagle || W. K. Y. Yeung || — || align=right | 5.4 km || 
|-id=612 bgcolor=#d6d6d6
| 140612 ||  || — || October 18, 2001 || Desert Eagle || W. K. Y. Yeung || — || align=right | 6.1 km || 
|-id=613 bgcolor=#d6d6d6
| 140613 ||  || — || October 18, 2001 || Desert Eagle || W. K. Y. Yeung || — || align=right | 4.2 km || 
|-id=614 bgcolor=#d6d6d6
| 140614 ||  || — || October 18, 2001 || Desert Eagle || W. K. Y. Yeung || — || align=right | 5.7 km || 
|-id=615 bgcolor=#E9E9E9
| 140615 ||  || — || October 18, 2001 || Desert Eagle || W. K. Y. Yeung || — || align=right | 5.8 km || 
|-id=616 bgcolor=#d6d6d6
| 140616 ||  || — || October 22, 2001 || Desert Eagle || W. K. Y. Yeung || — || align=right | 5.7 km || 
|-id=617 bgcolor=#d6d6d6
| 140617 ||  || — || October 17, 2001 || Socorro || LINEAR || — || align=right | 4.8 km || 
|-id=618 bgcolor=#d6d6d6
| 140618 ||  || — || October 17, 2001 || Socorro || LINEAR || — || align=right | 6.1 km || 
|-id=619 bgcolor=#d6d6d6
| 140619 ||  || — || October 17, 2001 || Socorro || LINEAR || — || align=right | 4.6 km || 
|-id=620 bgcolor=#E9E9E9
| 140620 Raoulwallenberg ||  ||  || October 21, 2001 || Desert Eagle || W. K. Y. Yeung || WIT || align=right | 2.0 km || 
|-id=621 bgcolor=#d6d6d6
| 140621 ||  || — || October 21, 2001 || Desert Eagle || W. K. Y. Yeung || HYG || align=right | 6.8 km || 
|-id=622 bgcolor=#d6d6d6
| 140622 ||  || — || October 24, 2001 || Desert Eagle || W. K. Y. Yeung || URS || align=right | 7.9 km || 
|-id=623 bgcolor=#E9E9E9
| 140623 ||  || — || October 24, 2001 || Desert Eagle || W. K. Y. Yeung || — || align=right | 5.6 km || 
|-id=624 bgcolor=#d6d6d6
| 140624 ||  || — || October 24, 2001 || Desert Eagle || W. K. Y. Yeung || — || align=right | 6.8 km || 
|-id=625 bgcolor=#d6d6d6
| 140625 ||  || — || October 24, 2001 || Desert Eagle || W. K. Y. Yeung || — || align=right | 5.2 km || 
|-id=626 bgcolor=#d6d6d6
| 140626 ||  || — || October 24, 2001 || Desert Eagle || W. K. Y. Yeung || EOS || align=right | 4.1 km || 
|-id=627 bgcolor=#d6d6d6
| 140627 ||  || — || October 24, 2001 || Desert Eagle || W. K. Y. Yeung || — || align=right | 6.3 km || 
|-id=628 bgcolor=#fefefe
| 140628 Klaipeda ||  ||  || October 20, 2001 || Molėtai || K. Černis, J. Zdanavičius || V || align=right | 1.2 km || 
|-id=629 bgcolor=#d6d6d6
| 140629 ||  || — || October 24, 2001 || Desert Eagle || W. K. Y. Yeung || — || align=right | 5.4 km || 
|-id=630 bgcolor=#d6d6d6
| 140630 ||  || — || October 24, 2001 || Desert Eagle || W. K. Y. Yeung || EOS || align=right | 5.3 km || 
|-id=631 bgcolor=#d6d6d6
| 140631 ||  || — || October 25, 2001 || Desert Eagle || W. K. Y. Yeung || — || align=right | 6.8 km || 
|-id=632 bgcolor=#d6d6d6
| 140632 ||  || — || October 26, 2001 || Emerald Lane || L. Ball || — || align=right | 3.9 km || 
|-id=633 bgcolor=#d6d6d6
| 140633 ||  || — || October 26, 2001 || Emerald Lane || L. Ball || — || align=right | 6.4 km || 
|-id=634 bgcolor=#d6d6d6
| 140634 ||  || — || October 16, 2001 || Palomar || NEAT || EOS || align=right | 3.3 km || 
|-id=635 bgcolor=#d6d6d6
| 140635 ||  || — || October 16, 2001 || Palomar || NEAT || HYG || align=right | 4.9 km || 
|-id=636 bgcolor=#d6d6d6
| 140636 ||  || — || October 17, 2001 || Socorro || LINEAR || TIR || align=right | 5.3 km || 
|-id=637 bgcolor=#E9E9E9
| 140637 ||  || — || October 17, 2001 || Socorro || LINEAR || INO || align=right | 2.1 km || 
|-id=638 bgcolor=#E9E9E9
| 140638 ||  || — || October 17, 2001 || Socorro || LINEAR || ADE || align=right | 5.5 km || 
|-id=639 bgcolor=#d6d6d6
| 140639 ||  || — || October 17, 2001 || Socorro || LINEAR || — || align=right | 3.9 km || 
|-id=640 bgcolor=#d6d6d6
| 140640 ||  || — || October 18, 2001 || Socorro || LINEAR || — || align=right | 7.3 km || 
|-id=641 bgcolor=#d6d6d6
| 140641 ||  || — || October 18, 2001 || Socorro || LINEAR || — || align=right | 4.6 km || 
|-id=642 bgcolor=#d6d6d6
| 140642 ||  || — || October 18, 2001 || Socorro || LINEAR || — || align=right | 5.2 km || 
|-id=643 bgcolor=#d6d6d6
| 140643 ||  || — || October 18, 2001 || Socorro || LINEAR || EOS || align=right | 5.1 km || 
|-id=644 bgcolor=#d6d6d6
| 140644 ||  || — || October 18, 2001 || Socorro || LINEAR || — || align=right | 6.4 km || 
|-id=645 bgcolor=#d6d6d6
| 140645 ||  || — || October 18, 2001 || Socorro || LINEAR || — || align=right | 7.6 km || 
|-id=646 bgcolor=#d6d6d6
| 140646 ||  || — || October 16, 2001 || Socorro || LINEAR || KOR || align=right | 2.5 km || 
|-id=647 bgcolor=#d6d6d6
| 140647 ||  || — || October 16, 2001 || Socorro || LINEAR || — || align=right | 4.4 km || 
|-id=648 bgcolor=#E9E9E9
| 140648 ||  || — || October 16, 2001 || Socorro || LINEAR || — || align=right | 4.6 km || 
|-id=649 bgcolor=#d6d6d6
| 140649 ||  || — || October 16, 2001 || Socorro || LINEAR || — || align=right | 4.6 km || 
|-id=650 bgcolor=#d6d6d6
| 140650 ||  || — || October 16, 2001 || Socorro || LINEAR || — || align=right | 3.5 km || 
|-id=651 bgcolor=#d6d6d6
| 140651 ||  || — || October 16, 2001 || Socorro || LINEAR || — || align=right | 7.0 km || 
|-id=652 bgcolor=#d6d6d6
| 140652 ||  || — || October 16, 2001 || Socorro || LINEAR || — || align=right | 5.4 km || 
|-id=653 bgcolor=#d6d6d6
| 140653 ||  || — || October 16, 2001 || Socorro || LINEAR || INA || align=right | 6.7 km || 
|-id=654 bgcolor=#d6d6d6
| 140654 ||  || — || October 16, 2001 || Socorro || LINEAR || — || align=right | 5.1 km || 
|-id=655 bgcolor=#d6d6d6
| 140655 ||  || — || October 16, 2001 || Socorro || LINEAR || — || align=right | 6.1 km || 
|-id=656 bgcolor=#d6d6d6
| 140656 ||  || — || October 17, 2001 || Socorro || LINEAR || — || align=right | 4.9 km || 
|-id=657 bgcolor=#d6d6d6
| 140657 ||  || — || October 17, 2001 || Socorro || LINEAR || — || align=right | 3.3 km || 
|-id=658 bgcolor=#E9E9E9
| 140658 ||  || — || October 17, 2001 || Socorro || LINEAR || — || align=right | 4.1 km || 
|-id=659 bgcolor=#d6d6d6
| 140659 ||  || — || October 17, 2001 || Socorro || LINEAR || — || align=right | 4.9 km || 
|-id=660 bgcolor=#d6d6d6
| 140660 ||  || — || October 17, 2001 || Socorro || LINEAR || — || align=right | 6.0 km || 
|-id=661 bgcolor=#d6d6d6
| 140661 ||  || — || October 17, 2001 || Socorro || LINEAR || KOR || align=right | 2.6 km || 
|-id=662 bgcolor=#E9E9E9
| 140662 ||  || — || October 17, 2001 || Socorro || LINEAR || — || align=right | 1.9 km || 
|-id=663 bgcolor=#E9E9E9
| 140663 ||  || — || October 17, 2001 || Socorro || LINEAR || — || align=right | 3.1 km || 
|-id=664 bgcolor=#d6d6d6
| 140664 ||  || — || October 17, 2001 || Socorro || LINEAR || — || align=right | 6.2 km || 
|-id=665 bgcolor=#d6d6d6
| 140665 ||  || — || October 17, 2001 || Socorro || LINEAR || CRO || align=right | 4.5 km || 
|-id=666 bgcolor=#d6d6d6
| 140666 ||  || — || October 17, 2001 || Socorro || LINEAR || — || align=right | 5.5 km || 
|-id=667 bgcolor=#E9E9E9
| 140667 ||  || — || October 17, 2001 || Socorro || LINEAR || — || align=right | 1.9 km || 
|-id=668 bgcolor=#d6d6d6
| 140668 ||  || — || October 17, 2001 || Socorro || LINEAR || EOS || align=right | 4.2 km || 
|-id=669 bgcolor=#d6d6d6
| 140669 ||  || — || October 17, 2001 || Socorro || LINEAR || EOS || align=right | 4.8 km || 
|-id=670 bgcolor=#d6d6d6
| 140670 ||  || — || October 17, 2001 || Socorro || LINEAR || EOS || align=right | 4.8 km || 
|-id=671 bgcolor=#d6d6d6
| 140671 ||  || — || October 17, 2001 || Socorro || LINEAR || critical || align=right | 4.9 km || 
|-id=672 bgcolor=#d6d6d6
| 140672 ||  || — || October 17, 2001 || Socorro || LINEAR || TEL || align=right | 3.1 km || 
|-id=673 bgcolor=#E9E9E9
| 140673 ||  || — || October 17, 2001 || Socorro || LINEAR || — || align=right | 2.8 km || 
|-id=674 bgcolor=#E9E9E9
| 140674 ||  || — || October 17, 2001 || Socorro || LINEAR || GEF || align=right | 2.5 km || 
|-id=675 bgcolor=#E9E9E9
| 140675 ||  || — || October 17, 2001 || Socorro || LINEAR || — || align=right | 3.0 km || 
|-id=676 bgcolor=#d6d6d6
| 140676 ||  || — || October 17, 2001 || Socorro || LINEAR || — || align=right | 4.4 km || 
|-id=677 bgcolor=#d6d6d6
| 140677 ||  || — || October 17, 2001 || Socorro || LINEAR || KOR || align=right | 2.1 km || 
|-id=678 bgcolor=#d6d6d6
| 140678 ||  || — || October 17, 2001 || Socorro || LINEAR || THM || align=right | 4.4 km || 
|-id=679 bgcolor=#E9E9E9
| 140679 ||  || — || October 17, 2001 || Socorro || LINEAR || NEM || align=right | 3.9 km || 
|-id=680 bgcolor=#E9E9E9
| 140680 ||  || — || October 17, 2001 || Socorro || LINEAR || — || align=right | 1.9 km || 
|-id=681 bgcolor=#d6d6d6
| 140681 ||  || — || October 17, 2001 || Socorro || LINEAR || — || align=right | 5.7 km || 
|-id=682 bgcolor=#d6d6d6
| 140682 ||  || — || October 17, 2001 || Socorro || LINEAR || — || align=right | 4.9 km || 
|-id=683 bgcolor=#E9E9E9
| 140683 ||  || — || October 18, 2001 || Socorro || LINEAR || — || align=right | 2.2 km || 
|-id=684 bgcolor=#E9E9E9
| 140684 ||  || — || October 16, 2001 || Socorro || LINEAR || GEF || align=right | 2.0 km || 
|-id=685 bgcolor=#d6d6d6
| 140685 ||  || — || October 16, 2001 || Socorro || LINEAR || EOS || align=right | 3.5 km || 
|-id=686 bgcolor=#d6d6d6
| 140686 ||  || — || October 17, 2001 || Socorro || LINEAR || — || align=right | 4.6 km || 
|-id=687 bgcolor=#E9E9E9
| 140687 ||  || — || October 17, 2001 || Socorro || LINEAR || — || align=right | 4.3 km || 
|-id=688 bgcolor=#d6d6d6
| 140688 ||  || — || October 17, 2001 || Socorro || LINEAR || — || align=right | 3.9 km || 
|-id=689 bgcolor=#d6d6d6
| 140689 ||  || — || October 17, 2001 || Socorro || LINEAR || HYG || align=right | 5.3 km || 
|-id=690 bgcolor=#d6d6d6
| 140690 ||  || — || October 17, 2001 || Socorro || LINEAR || KOR || align=right | 1.7 km || 
|-id=691 bgcolor=#d6d6d6
| 140691 ||  || — || October 18, 2001 || Socorro || LINEAR || EOS || align=right | 3.0 km || 
|-id=692 bgcolor=#d6d6d6
| 140692 ||  || — || October 18, 2001 || Socorro || LINEAR || — || align=right | 6.6 km || 
|-id=693 bgcolor=#d6d6d6
| 140693 ||  || — || October 18, 2001 || Socorro || LINEAR || — || align=right | 4.9 km || 
|-id=694 bgcolor=#d6d6d6
| 140694 ||  || — || October 18, 2001 || Socorro || LINEAR || — || align=right | 6.8 km || 
|-id=695 bgcolor=#d6d6d6
| 140695 ||  || — || October 17, 2001 || Kitt Peak || Spacewatch || KOR || align=right | 1.8 km || 
|-id=696 bgcolor=#d6d6d6
| 140696 ||  || — || October 16, 2001 || Socorro || LINEAR || KORfast? || align=right | 2.6 km || 
|-id=697 bgcolor=#d6d6d6
| 140697 ||  || — || October 17, 2001 || Socorro || LINEAR || — || align=right | 4.4 km || 
|-id=698 bgcolor=#d6d6d6
| 140698 ||  || — || October 17, 2001 || Socorro || LINEAR || — || align=right | 4.9 km || 
|-id=699 bgcolor=#d6d6d6
| 140699 ||  || — || October 17, 2001 || Socorro || LINEAR || EOS || align=right | 3.9 km || 
|-id=700 bgcolor=#d6d6d6
| 140700 ||  || — || October 17, 2001 || Socorro || LINEAR || — || align=right | 5.1 km || 
|}

140701–140800 

|-bgcolor=#d6d6d6
| 140701 ||  || — || October 17, 2001 || Socorro || LINEAR || — || align=right | 6.7 km || 
|-id=702 bgcolor=#E9E9E9
| 140702 ||  || — || October 17, 2001 || Socorro || LINEAR || — || align=right | 3.6 km || 
|-id=703 bgcolor=#d6d6d6
| 140703 ||  || — || October 17, 2001 || Socorro || LINEAR || — || align=right | 4.0 km || 
|-id=704 bgcolor=#d6d6d6
| 140704 ||  || — || October 17, 2001 || Socorro || LINEAR || — || align=right | 4.3 km || 
|-id=705 bgcolor=#d6d6d6
| 140705 ||  || — || October 20, 2001 || Socorro || LINEAR || TIR || align=right | 4.8 km || 
|-id=706 bgcolor=#E9E9E9
| 140706 ||  || — || October 20, 2001 || Socorro || LINEAR || — || align=right | 2.6 km || 
|-id=707 bgcolor=#d6d6d6
| 140707 ||  || — || October 20, 2001 || Socorro || LINEAR || KOR || align=right | 2.6 km || 
|-id=708 bgcolor=#d6d6d6
| 140708 ||  || — || October 20, 2001 || Socorro || LINEAR || — || align=right | 4.1 km || 
|-id=709 bgcolor=#d6d6d6
| 140709 ||  || — || October 20, 2001 || Socorro || LINEAR || — || align=right | 4.0 km || 
|-id=710 bgcolor=#d6d6d6
| 140710 ||  || — || October 20, 2001 || Socorro || LINEAR || — || align=right | 4.5 km || 
|-id=711 bgcolor=#d6d6d6
| 140711 ||  || — || October 16, 2001 || Kitt Peak || Spacewatch || — || align=right | 4.4 km || 
|-id=712 bgcolor=#d6d6d6
| 140712 ||  || — || October 21, 2001 || Kitt Peak || Spacewatch || HYG || align=right | 6.1 km || 
|-id=713 bgcolor=#d6d6d6
| 140713 ||  || — || October 20, 2001 || Haleakala || NEAT || EOS || align=right | 3.3 km || 
|-id=714 bgcolor=#d6d6d6
| 140714 ||  || — || October 22, 2001 || Palomar || NEAT || — || align=right | 3.6 km || 
|-id=715 bgcolor=#d6d6d6
| 140715 ||  || — || October 18, 2001 || Palomar || NEAT || — || align=right | 4.1 km || 
|-id=716 bgcolor=#d6d6d6
| 140716 ||  || — || October 18, 2001 || Palomar || NEAT || — || align=right | 3.9 km || 
|-id=717 bgcolor=#d6d6d6
| 140717 ||  || — || October 18, 2001 || Palomar || NEAT || EOS || align=right | 4.1 km || 
|-id=718 bgcolor=#d6d6d6
| 140718 ||  || — || October 19, 2001 || Haleakala || NEAT || URS || align=right | 3.8 km || 
|-id=719 bgcolor=#d6d6d6
| 140719 ||  || — || October 19, 2001 || Haleakala || NEAT || — || align=right | 6.4 km || 
|-id=720 bgcolor=#d6d6d6
| 140720 ||  || — || October 19, 2001 || Haleakala || NEAT || — || align=right | 8.3 km || 
|-id=721 bgcolor=#d6d6d6
| 140721 ||  || — || October 19, 2001 || Haleakala || NEAT || — || align=right | 5.3 km || 
|-id=722 bgcolor=#d6d6d6
| 140722 ||  || — || October 19, 2001 || Haleakala || NEAT || — || align=right | 5.3 km || 
|-id=723 bgcolor=#d6d6d6
| 140723 ||  || — || October 19, 2001 || Haleakala || NEAT || EOS || align=right | 3.2 km || 
|-id=724 bgcolor=#d6d6d6
| 140724 ||  || — || October 19, 2001 || Haleakala || NEAT || EOS || align=right | 4.3 km || 
|-id=725 bgcolor=#d6d6d6
| 140725 ||  || — || October 19, 2001 || Haleakala || NEAT || EOS || align=right | 5.4 km || 
|-id=726 bgcolor=#E9E9E9
| 140726 ||  || — || October 16, 2001 || Socorro || LINEAR || HOF || align=right | 4.8 km || 
|-id=727 bgcolor=#d6d6d6
| 140727 ||  || — || October 17, 2001 || Socorro || LINEAR || — || align=right | 3.2 km || 
|-id=728 bgcolor=#d6d6d6
| 140728 ||  || — || October 17, 2001 || Socorro || LINEAR || KOR || align=right | 2.0 km || 
|-id=729 bgcolor=#d6d6d6
| 140729 ||  || — || October 17, 2001 || Socorro || LINEAR || KOR || align=right | 2.3 km || 
|-id=730 bgcolor=#d6d6d6
| 140730 ||  || — || October 17, 2001 || Socorro || LINEAR || EOS || align=right | 3.7 km || 
|-id=731 bgcolor=#E9E9E9
| 140731 ||  || — || October 17, 2001 || Socorro || LINEAR || — || align=right | 4.4 km || 
|-id=732 bgcolor=#d6d6d6
| 140732 ||  || — || October 17, 2001 || Socorro || LINEAR || KOR || align=right | 2.5 km || 
|-id=733 bgcolor=#d6d6d6
| 140733 ||  || — || October 17, 2001 || Socorro || LINEAR || — || align=right | 3.3 km || 
|-id=734 bgcolor=#d6d6d6
| 140734 ||  || — || October 17, 2001 || Socorro || LINEAR || — || align=right | 4.1 km || 
|-id=735 bgcolor=#d6d6d6
| 140735 ||  || — || October 20, 2001 || Socorro || LINEAR || — || align=right | 5.2 km || 
|-id=736 bgcolor=#d6d6d6
| 140736 ||  || — || October 20, 2001 || Socorro || LINEAR || — || align=right | 6.0 km || 
|-id=737 bgcolor=#d6d6d6
| 140737 ||  || — || October 20, 2001 || Socorro || LINEAR || — || align=right | 3.2 km || 
|-id=738 bgcolor=#E9E9E9
| 140738 ||  || — || October 20, 2001 || Socorro || LINEAR || — || align=right | 3.1 km || 
|-id=739 bgcolor=#d6d6d6
| 140739 ||  || — || October 20, 2001 || Socorro || LINEAR || — || align=right | 4.1 km || 
|-id=740 bgcolor=#d6d6d6
| 140740 ||  || — || October 20, 2001 || Socorro || LINEAR || — || align=right | 4.2 km || 
|-id=741 bgcolor=#d6d6d6
| 140741 ||  || — || October 20, 2001 || Socorro || LINEAR || — || align=right | 3.9 km || 
|-id=742 bgcolor=#d6d6d6
| 140742 ||  || — || October 20, 2001 || Socorro || LINEAR || TIR || align=right | 2.9 km || 
|-id=743 bgcolor=#d6d6d6
| 140743 ||  || — || October 20, 2001 || Socorro || LINEAR || KOR || align=right | 1.8 km || 
|-id=744 bgcolor=#d6d6d6
| 140744 ||  || — || October 20, 2001 || Socorro || LINEAR || — || align=right | 4.1 km || 
|-id=745 bgcolor=#d6d6d6
| 140745 ||  || — || October 20, 2001 || Socorro || LINEAR || EOS || align=right | 3.7 km || 
|-id=746 bgcolor=#d6d6d6
| 140746 ||  || — || October 20, 2001 || Socorro || LINEAR || — || align=right | 4.1 km || 
|-id=747 bgcolor=#fefefe
| 140747 ||  || — || October 20, 2001 || Socorro || LINEAR || H || align=right | 1.1 km || 
|-id=748 bgcolor=#d6d6d6
| 140748 ||  || — || October 21, 2001 || Socorro || LINEAR || — || align=right | 3.5 km || 
|-id=749 bgcolor=#d6d6d6
| 140749 ||  || — || October 21, 2001 || Socorro || LINEAR || — || align=right | 5.6 km || 
|-id=750 bgcolor=#d6d6d6
| 140750 ||  || — || October 22, 2001 || Socorro || LINEAR || EOS || align=right | 3.2 km || 
|-id=751 bgcolor=#d6d6d6
| 140751 ||  || — || October 22, 2001 || Socorro || LINEAR || THM || align=right | 4.4 km || 
|-id=752 bgcolor=#d6d6d6
| 140752 ||  || — || October 22, 2001 || Socorro || LINEAR || — || align=right | 5.2 km || 
|-id=753 bgcolor=#d6d6d6
| 140753 ||  || — || October 22, 2001 || Socorro || LINEAR || — || align=right | 5.2 km || 
|-id=754 bgcolor=#d6d6d6
| 140754 ||  || — || October 22, 2001 || Socorro || LINEAR || — || align=right | 4.8 km || 
|-id=755 bgcolor=#d6d6d6
| 140755 ||  || — || October 22, 2001 || Socorro || LINEAR || KOR || align=right | 2.7 km || 
|-id=756 bgcolor=#d6d6d6
| 140756 ||  || — || October 22, 2001 || Socorro || LINEAR || — || align=right | 3.5 km || 
|-id=757 bgcolor=#d6d6d6
| 140757 ||  || — || October 22, 2001 || Socorro || LINEAR || — || align=right | 3.9 km || 
|-id=758 bgcolor=#d6d6d6
| 140758 ||  || — || October 22, 2001 || Socorro || LINEAR || KOR || align=right | 2.1 km || 
|-id=759 bgcolor=#d6d6d6
| 140759 ||  || — || October 22, 2001 || Socorro || LINEAR || HYG || align=right | 4.8 km || 
|-id=760 bgcolor=#d6d6d6
| 140760 ||  || — || October 22, 2001 || Socorro || LINEAR || THM || align=right | 3.9 km || 
|-id=761 bgcolor=#E9E9E9
| 140761 ||  || — || October 22, 2001 || Socorro || LINEAR || — || align=right | 3.1 km || 
|-id=762 bgcolor=#E9E9E9
| 140762 ||  || — || October 22, 2001 || Socorro || LINEAR || — || align=right | 3.4 km || 
|-id=763 bgcolor=#d6d6d6
| 140763 ||  || — || October 22, 2001 || Socorro || LINEAR || — || align=right | 3.8 km || 
|-id=764 bgcolor=#d6d6d6
| 140764 ||  || — || October 22, 2001 || Socorro || LINEAR || URS || align=right | 8.9 km || 
|-id=765 bgcolor=#d6d6d6
| 140765 ||  || — || October 22, 2001 || Socorro || LINEAR || — || align=right | 7.9 km || 
|-id=766 bgcolor=#d6d6d6
| 140766 ||  || — || October 22, 2001 || Socorro || LINEAR || — || align=right | 6.7 km || 
|-id=767 bgcolor=#d6d6d6
| 140767 ||  || — || October 22, 2001 || Socorro || LINEAR || — || align=right | 5.7 km || 
|-id=768 bgcolor=#d6d6d6
| 140768 ||  || — || October 22, 2001 || Socorro || LINEAR || — || align=right | 6.8 km || 
|-id=769 bgcolor=#d6d6d6
| 140769 ||  || — || October 22, 2001 || Palomar || NEAT || — || align=right | 4.2 km || 
|-id=770 bgcolor=#d6d6d6
| 140770 ||  || — || October 23, 2001 || Palomar || NEAT || — || align=right | 5.1 km || 
|-id=771 bgcolor=#d6d6d6
| 140771 ||  || — || October 23, 2001 || Palomar || NEAT || — || align=right | 6.5 km || 
|-id=772 bgcolor=#d6d6d6
| 140772 ||  || — || October 17, 2001 || Socorro || LINEAR || — || align=right | 7.2 km || 
|-id=773 bgcolor=#d6d6d6
| 140773 ||  || — || October 20, 2001 || Socorro || LINEAR || BRA || align=right | 2.9 km || 
|-id=774 bgcolor=#d6d6d6
| 140774 ||  || — || October 20, 2001 || Socorro || LINEAR || — || align=right | 4.5 km || 
|-id=775 bgcolor=#d6d6d6
| 140775 ||  || — || October 20, 2001 || Socorro || LINEAR || — || align=right | 4.6 km || 
|-id=776 bgcolor=#d6d6d6
| 140776 ||  || — || October 20, 2001 || Socorro || LINEAR || — || align=right | 6.3 km || 
|-id=777 bgcolor=#d6d6d6
| 140777 ||  || — || October 20, 2001 || Socorro || LINEAR || KOR || align=right | 1.8 km || 
|-id=778 bgcolor=#d6d6d6
| 140778 ||  || — || October 21, 2001 || Socorro || LINEAR || KAR || align=right | 1.4 km || 
|-id=779 bgcolor=#E9E9E9
| 140779 ||  || — || October 21, 2001 || Socorro || LINEAR || MRX || align=right | 2.1 km || 
|-id=780 bgcolor=#d6d6d6
| 140780 ||  || — || October 21, 2001 || Socorro || LINEAR || — || align=right | 3.3 km || 
|-id=781 bgcolor=#E9E9E9
| 140781 ||  || — || October 21, 2001 || Socorro || LINEAR || DOR || align=right | 5.1 km || 
|-id=782 bgcolor=#d6d6d6
| 140782 ||  || — || October 22, 2001 || Socorro || LINEAR || — || align=right | 4.1 km || 
|-id=783 bgcolor=#E9E9E9
| 140783 ||  || — || October 23, 2001 || Socorro || LINEAR || — || align=right | 2.5 km || 
|-id=784 bgcolor=#d6d6d6
| 140784 ||  || — || October 23, 2001 || Socorro || LINEAR || — || align=right | 5.0 km || 
|-id=785 bgcolor=#d6d6d6
| 140785 ||  || — || October 23, 2001 || Socorro || LINEAR || — || align=right | 5.3 km || 
|-id=786 bgcolor=#E9E9E9
| 140786 ||  || — || October 23, 2001 || Socorro || LINEAR || — || align=right | 1.4 km || 
|-id=787 bgcolor=#E9E9E9
| 140787 ||  || — || October 23, 2001 || Socorro || LINEAR || — || align=right | 3.6 km || 
|-id=788 bgcolor=#d6d6d6
| 140788 ||  || — || October 23, 2001 || Socorro || LINEAR || KOR || align=right | 2.7 km || 
|-id=789 bgcolor=#d6d6d6
| 140789 ||  || — || October 23, 2001 || Socorro || LINEAR || EOS || align=right | 3.0 km || 
|-id=790 bgcolor=#d6d6d6
| 140790 ||  || — || October 23, 2001 || Socorro || LINEAR || — || align=right | 5.4 km || 
|-id=791 bgcolor=#d6d6d6
| 140791 ||  || — || October 23, 2001 || Socorro || LINEAR || HYG || align=right | 4.5 km || 
|-id=792 bgcolor=#d6d6d6
| 140792 ||  || — || October 23, 2001 || Socorro || LINEAR || — || align=right | 5.1 km || 
|-id=793 bgcolor=#d6d6d6
| 140793 ||  || — || October 23, 2001 || Socorro || LINEAR || — || align=right | 6.1 km || 
|-id=794 bgcolor=#d6d6d6
| 140794 ||  || — || October 23, 2001 || Socorro || LINEAR || — || align=right | 5.0 km || 
|-id=795 bgcolor=#d6d6d6
| 140795 ||  || — || October 23, 2001 || Socorro || LINEAR || — || align=right | 5.1 km || 
|-id=796 bgcolor=#d6d6d6
| 140796 ||  || — || October 23, 2001 || Socorro || LINEAR || — || align=right | 5.5 km || 
|-id=797 bgcolor=#d6d6d6
| 140797 ||  || — || October 23, 2001 || Socorro || LINEAR || — || align=right | 3.6 km || 
|-id=798 bgcolor=#d6d6d6
| 140798 ||  || — || October 23, 2001 || Socorro || LINEAR || KOR || align=right | 2.3 km || 
|-id=799 bgcolor=#d6d6d6
| 140799 ||  || — || October 23, 2001 || Socorro || LINEAR || — || align=right | 4.5 km || 
|-id=800 bgcolor=#d6d6d6
| 140800 ||  || — || October 23, 2001 || Socorro || LINEAR || HYG || align=right | 5.3 km || 
|}

140801–140900 

|-bgcolor=#d6d6d6
| 140801 ||  || — || October 23, 2001 || Socorro || LINEAR || KOR || align=right | 2.7 km || 
|-id=802 bgcolor=#d6d6d6
| 140802 ||  || — || October 23, 2001 || Socorro || LINEAR || HYG || align=right | 4.9 km || 
|-id=803 bgcolor=#d6d6d6
| 140803 ||  || — || October 23, 2001 || Socorro || LINEAR || — || align=right | 5.4 km || 
|-id=804 bgcolor=#E9E9E9
| 140804 ||  || — || October 23, 2001 || Socorro || LINEAR || — || align=right | 2.8 km || 
|-id=805 bgcolor=#d6d6d6
| 140805 ||  || — || October 23, 2001 || Socorro || LINEAR || KOR || align=right | 2.6 km || 
|-id=806 bgcolor=#d6d6d6
| 140806 ||  || — || October 23, 2001 || Socorro || LINEAR || — || align=right | 6.1 km || 
|-id=807 bgcolor=#d6d6d6
| 140807 ||  || — || October 23, 2001 || Socorro || LINEAR || — || align=right | 7.9 km || 
|-id=808 bgcolor=#d6d6d6
| 140808 ||  || — || October 23, 2001 || Socorro || LINEAR || — || align=right | 4.4 km || 
|-id=809 bgcolor=#d6d6d6
| 140809 ||  || — || October 23, 2001 || Socorro || LINEAR || KOR || align=right | 2.7 km || 
|-id=810 bgcolor=#d6d6d6
| 140810 ||  || — || October 23, 2001 || Socorro || LINEAR || EOS || align=right | 3.0 km || 
|-id=811 bgcolor=#d6d6d6
| 140811 ||  || — || October 23, 2001 || Socorro || LINEAR || — || align=right | 3.7 km || 
|-id=812 bgcolor=#d6d6d6
| 140812 ||  || — || October 23, 2001 || Socorro || LINEAR || EOS || align=right | 3.3 km || 
|-id=813 bgcolor=#d6d6d6
| 140813 ||  || — || October 23, 2001 || Socorro || LINEAR || — || align=right | 4.1 km || 
|-id=814 bgcolor=#d6d6d6
| 140814 ||  || — || October 23, 2001 || Socorro || LINEAR || — || align=right | 3.5 km || 
|-id=815 bgcolor=#d6d6d6
| 140815 ||  || — || October 23, 2001 || Socorro || LINEAR || — || align=right | 4.6 km || 
|-id=816 bgcolor=#d6d6d6
| 140816 ||  || — || October 23, 2001 || Socorro || LINEAR || — || align=right | 4.1 km || 
|-id=817 bgcolor=#d6d6d6
| 140817 ||  || — || October 23, 2001 || Socorro || LINEAR || — || align=right | 4.9 km || 
|-id=818 bgcolor=#d6d6d6
| 140818 ||  || — || October 23, 2001 || Socorro || LINEAR || — || align=right | 4.7 km || 
|-id=819 bgcolor=#d6d6d6
| 140819 ||  || — || October 23, 2001 || Socorro || LINEAR || CHA || align=right | 3.4 km || 
|-id=820 bgcolor=#d6d6d6
| 140820 ||  || — || October 23, 2001 || Socorro || LINEAR || EUP || align=right | 8.8 km || 
|-id=821 bgcolor=#d6d6d6
| 140821 ||  || — || October 18, 2001 || Palomar || NEAT || — || align=right | 3.6 km || 
|-id=822 bgcolor=#d6d6d6
| 140822 ||  || — || October 19, 2001 || Palomar || NEAT || — || align=right | 3.2 km || 
|-id=823 bgcolor=#d6d6d6
| 140823 ||  || — || October 23, 2001 || Palomar || NEAT || EOS || align=right | 5.4 km || 
|-id=824 bgcolor=#d6d6d6
| 140824 ||  || — || October 18, 2001 || Socorro || LINEAR || — || align=right | 4.9 km || 
|-id=825 bgcolor=#d6d6d6
| 140825 ||  || — || October 19, 2001 || Socorro || LINEAR || — || align=right | 5.9 km || 
|-id=826 bgcolor=#d6d6d6
| 140826 ||  || — || October 19, 2001 || Socorro || LINEAR || MEL || align=right | 6.4 km || 
|-id=827 bgcolor=#d6d6d6
| 140827 ||  || — || October 21, 2001 || Socorro || LINEAR || EOS || align=right | 3.7 km || 
|-id=828 bgcolor=#d6d6d6
| 140828 ||  || — || October 18, 2001 || Palomar || NEAT || — || align=right | 4.8 km || 
|-id=829 bgcolor=#E9E9E9
| 140829 ||  || — || October 18, 2001 || Palomar || NEAT || HOF || align=right | 3.8 km || 
|-id=830 bgcolor=#d6d6d6
| 140830 ||  || — || October 18, 2001 || Palomar || NEAT || — || align=right | 4.0 km || 
|-id=831 bgcolor=#d6d6d6
| 140831 ||  || — || October 19, 2001 || Palomar || NEAT || — || align=right | 3.2 km || 
|-id=832 bgcolor=#d6d6d6
| 140832 ||  || — || October 24, 2001 || Palomar || NEAT || EOS || align=right | 2.8 km || 
|-id=833 bgcolor=#d6d6d6
| 140833 ||  || — || October 25, 2001 || Palomar || NEAT || KOR || align=right | 2.3 km || 
|-id=834 bgcolor=#d6d6d6
| 140834 ||  || — || October 25, 2001 || Palomar || NEAT || — || align=right | 4.6 km || 
|-id=835 bgcolor=#E9E9E9
| 140835 ||  || — || October 16, 2001 || Palomar || NEAT || — || align=right | 2.2 km || 
|-id=836 bgcolor=#d6d6d6
| 140836 ||  || — || October 18, 2001 || Socorro || LINEAR || — || align=right | 5.1 km || 
|-id=837 bgcolor=#d6d6d6
| 140837 ||  || — || October 18, 2001 || Socorro || LINEAR || — || align=right | 5.5 km || 
|-id=838 bgcolor=#d6d6d6
| 140838 ||  || — || October 18, 2001 || Socorro || LINEAR || — || align=right | 6.0 km || 
|-id=839 bgcolor=#E9E9E9
| 140839 ||  || — || October 18, 2001 || Socorro || LINEAR || — || align=right | 2.5 km || 
|-id=840 bgcolor=#d6d6d6
| 140840 ||  || — || October 18, 2001 || Socorro || LINEAR || — || align=right | 6.7 km || 
|-id=841 bgcolor=#d6d6d6
| 140841 ||  || — || October 19, 2001 || Palomar || NEAT || EOS || align=right | 3.3 km || 
|-id=842 bgcolor=#d6d6d6
| 140842 ||  || — || October 19, 2001 || Anderson Mesa || LONEOS || — || align=right | 4.3 km || 
|-id=843 bgcolor=#E9E9E9
| 140843 ||  || — || October 19, 2001 || Palomar || NEAT || — || align=right | 3.2 km || 
|-id=844 bgcolor=#d6d6d6
| 140844 ||  || — || October 20, 2001 || Socorro || LINEAR || — || align=right | 5.1 km || 
|-id=845 bgcolor=#d6d6d6
| 140845 ||  || — || October 20, 2001 || Kitt Peak || Spacewatch || TRE || align=right | 2.9 km || 
|-id=846 bgcolor=#d6d6d6
| 140846 ||  || — || October 20, 2001 || Socorro || LINEAR || BRA || align=right | 3.4 km || 
|-id=847 bgcolor=#E9E9E9
| 140847 ||  || — || October 20, 2001 || Palomar || NEAT || — || align=right | 2.5 km || 
|-id=848 bgcolor=#d6d6d6
| 140848 ||  || — || October 21, 2001 || Anderson Mesa || LONEOS || — || align=right | 4.5 km || 
|-id=849 bgcolor=#d6d6d6
| 140849 ||  || — || October 21, 2001 || Socorro || LINEAR || — || align=right | 4.4 km || 
|-id=850 bgcolor=#d6d6d6
| 140850 ||  || — || October 21, 2001 || Socorro || LINEAR || — || align=right | 3.5 km || 
|-id=851 bgcolor=#d6d6d6
| 140851 ||  || — || October 22, 2001 || Socorro || LINEAR || — || align=right | 5.2 km || 
|-id=852 bgcolor=#d6d6d6
| 140852 ||  || — || October 23, 2001 || Socorro || LINEAR || — || align=right | 5.2 km || 
|-id=853 bgcolor=#d6d6d6
| 140853 ||  || — || October 23, 2001 || Desert Eagle || W. K. Y. Yeung || — || align=right | 5.4 km || 
|-id=854 bgcolor=#d6d6d6
| 140854 ||  || — || October 17, 2001 || Socorro || LINEAR || — || align=right | 5.7 km || 
|-id=855 bgcolor=#d6d6d6
| 140855 ||  || — || October 17, 2001 || Socorro || LINEAR || — || align=right | 8.0 km || 
|-id=856 bgcolor=#E9E9E9
| 140856 ||  || — || October 18, 2001 || Palomar || NEAT || GEF || align=right | 1.7 km || 
|-id=857 bgcolor=#d6d6d6
| 140857 ||  || — || October 24, 2001 || Socorro || LINEAR || KOR || align=right | 2.0 km || 
|-id=858 bgcolor=#d6d6d6
| 140858 ||  || — || October 24, 2001 || Kvistaberg || UDAS || — || align=right | 3.9 km || 
|-id=859 bgcolor=#d6d6d6
| 140859 || 2001 VP || — || November 7, 2001 || Socorro || LINEAR || EUP || align=right | 6.8 km || 
|-id=860 bgcolor=#E9E9E9
| 140860 || 2001 VW || — || November 6, 2001 || Socorro || LINEAR || — || align=right | 2.4 km || 
|-id=861 bgcolor=#E9E9E9
| 140861 ||  || — || November 6, 2001 || Socorro || LINEAR || — || align=right | 2.9 km || 
|-id=862 bgcolor=#d6d6d6
| 140862 ||  || — || November 9, 2001 || Kitt Peak || Spacewatch || — || align=right | 4.1 km || 
|-id=863 bgcolor=#d6d6d6
| 140863 ||  || — || November 11, 2001 || Kitt Peak || Spacewatch || KAR || align=right | 1.7 km || 
|-id=864 bgcolor=#fefefe
| 140864 ||  || — || November 9, 2001 || Socorro || LINEAR || H || align=right | 1.1 km || 
|-id=865 bgcolor=#d6d6d6
| 140865 ||  || — || November 9, 2001 || Socorro || LINEAR || NAE || align=right | 4.9 km || 
|-id=866 bgcolor=#d6d6d6
| 140866 ||  || — || November 10, 2001 || Socorro || LINEAR || — || align=right | 5.8 km || 
|-id=867 bgcolor=#d6d6d6
| 140867 ||  || — || November 10, 2001 || Socorro || LINEAR || — || align=right | 5.6 km || 
|-id=868 bgcolor=#d6d6d6
| 140868 ||  || — || November 10, 2001 || Socorro || LINEAR || — || align=right | 5.5 km || 
|-id=869 bgcolor=#fefefe
| 140869 ||  || — || November 10, 2001 || Socorro || LINEAR || — || align=right | 1.8 km || 
|-id=870 bgcolor=#d6d6d6
| 140870 ||  || — || November 10, 2001 || Socorro || LINEAR || URS || align=right | 6.7 km || 
|-id=871 bgcolor=#d6d6d6
| 140871 ||  || — || November 10, 2001 || Socorro || LINEAR || — || align=right | 5.4 km || 
|-id=872 bgcolor=#E9E9E9
| 140872 ||  || — || November 7, 2001 || Palomar || NEAT || — || align=right | 3.2 km || 
|-id=873 bgcolor=#d6d6d6
| 140873 ||  || — || November 11, 2001 || Ondřejov || P. Kušnirák, P. Pravec || — || align=right | 5.5 km || 
|-id=874 bgcolor=#d6d6d6
| 140874 ||  || — || November 9, 2001 || Bergisch Gladbach || W. Bickel || — || align=right | 8.2 km || 
|-id=875 bgcolor=#d6d6d6
| 140875 ||  || — || November 8, 2001 || Socorro || LINEAR || — || align=right | 5.7 km || 
|-id=876 bgcolor=#d6d6d6
| 140876 ||  || — || November 9, 2001 || Socorro || LINEAR || — || align=right | 6.2 km || 
|-id=877 bgcolor=#d6d6d6
| 140877 ||  || — || November 9, 2001 || Socorro || LINEAR || THM || align=right | 4.3 km || 
|-id=878 bgcolor=#d6d6d6
| 140878 ||  || — || November 9, 2001 || Socorro || LINEAR || — || align=right | 5.5 km || 
|-id=879 bgcolor=#d6d6d6
| 140879 ||  || — || November 9, 2001 || Socorro || LINEAR || — || align=right | 4.4 km || 
|-id=880 bgcolor=#E9E9E9
| 140880 ||  || — || November 9, 2001 || Socorro || LINEAR || — || align=right | 3.0 km || 
|-id=881 bgcolor=#d6d6d6
| 140881 ||  || — || November 9, 2001 || Socorro || LINEAR || HYG || align=right | 4.7 km || 
|-id=882 bgcolor=#d6d6d6
| 140882 ||  || — || November 9, 2001 || Socorro || LINEAR || — || align=right | 5.4 km || 
|-id=883 bgcolor=#E9E9E9
| 140883 ||  || — || November 9, 2001 || Socorro || LINEAR || — || align=right | 3.9 km || 
|-id=884 bgcolor=#d6d6d6
| 140884 ||  || — || November 9, 2001 || Socorro || LINEAR || EOS || align=right | 4.0 km || 
|-id=885 bgcolor=#d6d6d6
| 140885 ||  || — || November 9, 2001 || Socorro || LINEAR || — || align=right | 5.8 km || 
|-id=886 bgcolor=#d6d6d6
| 140886 ||  || — || November 9, 2001 || Socorro || LINEAR || — || align=right | 5.3 km || 
|-id=887 bgcolor=#d6d6d6
| 140887 ||  || — || November 9, 2001 || Socorro || LINEAR || THM || align=right | 3.5 km || 
|-id=888 bgcolor=#d6d6d6
| 140888 ||  || — || November 9, 2001 || Socorro || LINEAR || — || align=right | 9.3 km || 
|-id=889 bgcolor=#d6d6d6
| 140889 ||  || — || November 9, 2001 || Socorro || LINEAR || — || align=right | 4.1 km || 
|-id=890 bgcolor=#d6d6d6
| 140890 ||  || — || November 9, 2001 || Socorro || LINEAR || THM || align=right | 4.4 km || 
|-id=891 bgcolor=#E9E9E9
| 140891 ||  || — || November 9, 2001 || Socorro || LINEAR || GAL || align=right | 3.0 km || 
|-id=892 bgcolor=#d6d6d6
| 140892 ||  || — || November 9, 2001 || Socorro || LINEAR || — || align=right | 6.6 km || 
|-id=893 bgcolor=#d6d6d6
| 140893 ||  || — || November 9, 2001 || Socorro || LINEAR || THM || align=right | 5.0 km || 
|-id=894 bgcolor=#d6d6d6
| 140894 ||  || — || November 9, 2001 || Socorro || LINEAR || — || align=right | 4.3 km || 
|-id=895 bgcolor=#d6d6d6
| 140895 ||  || — || November 9, 2001 || Socorro || LINEAR || — || align=right | 5.0 km || 
|-id=896 bgcolor=#d6d6d6
| 140896 ||  || — || November 9, 2001 || Socorro || LINEAR || — || align=right | 8.6 km || 
|-id=897 bgcolor=#d6d6d6
| 140897 ||  || — || November 9, 2001 || Socorro || LINEAR || — || align=right | 4.9 km || 
|-id=898 bgcolor=#d6d6d6
| 140898 ||  || — || November 9, 2001 || Socorro || LINEAR || — || align=right | 5.8 km || 
|-id=899 bgcolor=#d6d6d6
| 140899 ||  || — || November 9, 2001 || Socorro || LINEAR || — || align=right | 5.4 km || 
|-id=900 bgcolor=#d6d6d6
| 140900 ||  || — || November 9, 2001 || Socorro || LINEAR || — || align=right | 7.7 km || 
|}

140901–141000 

|-bgcolor=#d6d6d6
| 140901 ||  || — || November 9, 2001 || Socorro || LINEAR || LIX || align=right | 7.1 km || 
|-id=902 bgcolor=#d6d6d6
| 140902 ||  || — || November 10, 2001 || Socorro || LINEAR || EOS || align=right | 3.0 km || 
|-id=903 bgcolor=#d6d6d6
| 140903 ||  || — || November 10, 2001 || Socorro || LINEAR || NAE || align=right | 6.6 km || 
|-id=904 bgcolor=#d6d6d6
| 140904 ||  || — || November 10, 2001 || Socorro || LINEAR || — || align=right | 4.8 km || 
|-id=905 bgcolor=#d6d6d6
| 140905 ||  || — || November 10, 2001 || Socorro || LINEAR || — || align=right | 5.9 km || 
|-id=906 bgcolor=#E9E9E9
| 140906 ||  || — || November 10, 2001 || Socorro || LINEAR || — || align=right | 5.1 km || 
|-id=907 bgcolor=#E9E9E9
| 140907 ||  || — || November 10, 2001 || Socorro || LINEAR || — || align=right | 3.0 km || 
|-id=908 bgcolor=#d6d6d6
| 140908 ||  || — || November 10, 2001 || Socorro || LINEAR || — || align=right | 6.3 km || 
|-id=909 bgcolor=#d6d6d6
| 140909 ||  || — || November 10, 2001 || Socorro || LINEAR || — || align=right | 5.9 km || 
|-id=910 bgcolor=#d6d6d6
| 140910 ||  || — || November 10, 2001 || Socorro || LINEAR || — || align=right | 6.3 km || 
|-id=911 bgcolor=#d6d6d6
| 140911 ||  || — || November 10, 2001 || Socorro || LINEAR || — || align=right | 5.7 km || 
|-id=912 bgcolor=#E9E9E9
| 140912 ||  || — || November 10, 2001 || Socorro || LINEAR || — || align=right | 2.5 km || 
|-id=913 bgcolor=#d6d6d6
| 140913 ||  || — || November 10, 2001 || Socorro || LINEAR || EOS || align=right | 4.2 km || 
|-id=914 bgcolor=#d6d6d6
| 140914 ||  || — || November 10, 2001 || Socorro || LINEAR || — || align=right | 5.8 km || 
|-id=915 bgcolor=#d6d6d6
| 140915 ||  || — || November 10, 2001 || Socorro || LINEAR || — || align=right | 5.9 km || 
|-id=916 bgcolor=#d6d6d6
| 140916 ||  || — || November 10, 2001 || Socorro || LINEAR || — || align=right | 6.0 km || 
|-id=917 bgcolor=#d6d6d6
| 140917 ||  || — || November 10, 2001 || Socorro || LINEAR || — || align=right | 6.2 km || 
|-id=918 bgcolor=#d6d6d6
| 140918 ||  || — || November 10, 2001 || Socorro || LINEAR || — || align=right | 7.6 km || 
|-id=919 bgcolor=#d6d6d6
| 140919 ||  || — || November 10, 2001 || Socorro || LINEAR || — || align=right | 5.2 km || 
|-id=920 bgcolor=#E9E9E9
| 140920 ||  || — || November 10, 2001 || Socorro || LINEAR || MRX || align=right | 1.9 km || 
|-id=921 bgcolor=#d6d6d6
| 140921 ||  || — || November 10, 2001 || Socorro || LINEAR || — || align=right | 5.8 km || 
|-id=922 bgcolor=#E9E9E9
| 140922 ||  || — || November 10, 2001 || Socorro || LINEAR || — || align=right | 3.5 km || 
|-id=923 bgcolor=#E9E9E9
| 140923 ||  || — || November 10, 2001 || Socorro || LINEAR || — || align=right | 1.9 km || 
|-id=924 bgcolor=#d6d6d6
| 140924 ||  || — || November 11, 2001 || Socorro || LINEAR || — || align=right | 6.0 km || 
|-id=925 bgcolor=#d6d6d6
| 140925 ||  || — || November 11, 2001 || Socorro || LINEAR || — || align=right | 8.3 km || 
|-id=926 bgcolor=#d6d6d6
| 140926 ||  || — || November 11, 2001 || Socorro || LINEAR || — || align=right | 7.7 km || 
|-id=927 bgcolor=#d6d6d6
| 140927 ||  || — || November 14, 2001 || Kitt Peak || Spacewatch || — || align=right | 4.7 km || 
|-id=928 bgcolor=#FFC2E0
| 140928 ||  || — || November 12, 2001 || Socorro || LINEAR || AMO +1km || align=right data-sort-value="0.83" | 830 m || 
|-id=929 bgcolor=#d6d6d6
| 140929 ||  || — || November 11, 2001 || Kitt Peak || Spacewatch || — || align=right | 4.9 km || 
|-id=930 bgcolor=#d6d6d6
| 140930 ||  || — || November 9, 2001 || Palomar || NEAT || HYG || align=right | 4.4 km || 
|-id=931 bgcolor=#d6d6d6
| 140931 ||  || — || November 15, 2001 || Palomar || NEAT || — || align=right | 4.2 km || 
|-id=932 bgcolor=#fefefe
| 140932 ||  || — || November 12, 2001 || Socorro || LINEAR || H || align=right | 1.4 km || 
|-id=933 bgcolor=#d6d6d6
| 140933 ||  || — || November 10, 2001 || Socorro || LINEAR || — || align=right | 5.4 km || 
|-id=934 bgcolor=#d6d6d6
| 140934 ||  || — || November 11, 2001 || Socorro || LINEAR || — || align=right | 3.6 km || 
|-id=935 bgcolor=#d6d6d6
| 140935 ||  || — || November 12, 2001 || Socorro || LINEAR || BRA || align=right | 4.0 km || 
|-id=936 bgcolor=#d6d6d6
| 140936 ||  || — || November 12, 2001 || Socorro || LINEAR || EOS || align=right | 3.4 km || 
|-id=937 bgcolor=#d6d6d6
| 140937 ||  || — || November 13, 2001 || Socorro || LINEAR || — || align=right | 6.7 km || 
|-id=938 bgcolor=#d6d6d6
| 140938 ||  || — || November 12, 2001 || Anderson Mesa || LONEOS || MEL || align=right | 7.1 km || 
|-id=939 bgcolor=#d6d6d6
| 140939 ||  || — || November 15, 2001 || Socorro || LINEAR || — || align=right | 7.2 km || 
|-id=940 bgcolor=#d6d6d6
| 140940 ||  || — || November 15, 2001 || Socorro || LINEAR || — || align=right | 4.6 km || 
|-id=941 bgcolor=#d6d6d6
| 140941 ||  || — || November 15, 2001 || Socorro || LINEAR || — || align=right | 7.7 km || 
|-id=942 bgcolor=#d6d6d6
| 140942 ||  || — || November 15, 2001 || Socorro || LINEAR || — || align=right | 6.3 km || 
|-id=943 bgcolor=#d6d6d6
| 140943 ||  || — || November 15, 2001 || Socorro || LINEAR || EUP || align=right | 6.3 km || 
|-id=944 bgcolor=#d6d6d6
| 140944 ||  || — || November 15, 2001 || Socorro || LINEAR || — || align=right | 4.7 km || 
|-id=945 bgcolor=#d6d6d6
| 140945 ||  || — || November 15, 2001 || Socorro || LINEAR || — || align=right | 7.1 km || 
|-id=946 bgcolor=#d6d6d6
| 140946 ||  || — || November 15, 2001 || Socorro || LINEAR || — || align=right | 4.6 km || 
|-id=947 bgcolor=#d6d6d6
| 140947 ||  || — || November 15, 2001 || Socorro || LINEAR || URS || align=right | 5.9 km || 
|-id=948 bgcolor=#d6d6d6
| 140948 ||  || — || November 15, 2001 || Socorro || LINEAR || IMH || align=right | 5.5 km || 
|-id=949 bgcolor=#d6d6d6
| 140949 ||  || — || November 15, 2001 || Socorro || LINEAR || — || align=right | 7.4 km || 
|-id=950 bgcolor=#d6d6d6
| 140950 ||  || — || November 15, 2001 || Socorro || LINEAR || — || align=right | 7.0 km || 
|-id=951 bgcolor=#E9E9E9
| 140951 ||  || — || November 15, 2001 || Socorro || LINEAR || PAL || align=right | 7.1 km || 
|-id=952 bgcolor=#E9E9E9
| 140952 ||  || — || November 12, 2001 || Anderson Mesa || LONEOS || — || align=right | 3.4 km || 
|-id=953 bgcolor=#fefefe
| 140953 ||  || — || November 8, 2001 || Socorro || LINEAR || H || align=right | 1.2 km || 
|-id=954 bgcolor=#d6d6d6
| 140954 ||  || — || November 12, 2001 || Socorro || LINEAR || — || align=right | 3.3 km || 
|-id=955 bgcolor=#d6d6d6
| 140955 ||  || — || November 12, 2001 || Socorro || LINEAR || VER || align=right | 5.1 km || 
|-id=956 bgcolor=#d6d6d6
| 140956 ||  || — || November 12, 2001 || Socorro || LINEAR || — || align=right | 6.4 km || 
|-id=957 bgcolor=#d6d6d6
| 140957 ||  || — || November 12, 2001 || Socorro || LINEAR || AEG || align=right | 5.9 km || 
|-id=958 bgcolor=#d6d6d6
| 140958 ||  || — || November 12, 2001 || Socorro || LINEAR || — || align=right | 3.5 km || 
|-id=959 bgcolor=#d6d6d6
| 140959 ||  || — || November 12, 2001 || Socorro || LINEAR || — || align=right | 4.2 km || 
|-id=960 bgcolor=#d6d6d6
| 140960 ||  || — || November 12, 2001 || Socorro || LINEAR || — || align=right | 5.0 km || 
|-id=961 bgcolor=#d6d6d6
| 140961 ||  || — || November 12, 2001 || Socorro || LINEAR || EOS || align=right | 3.7 km || 
|-id=962 bgcolor=#d6d6d6
| 140962 ||  || — || November 12, 2001 || Socorro || LINEAR || — || align=right | 5.3 km || 
|-id=963 bgcolor=#E9E9E9
| 140963 ||  || — || November 12, 2001 || Socorro || LINEAR || — || align=right | 3.2 km || 
|-id=964 bgcolor=#d6d6d6
| 140964 ||  || — || November 12, 2001 || Socorro || LINEAR || — || align=right | 6.1 km || 
|-id=965 bgcolor=#d6d6d6
| 140965 ||  || — || November 12, 2001 || Socorro || LINEAR || EMA || align=right | 4.3 km || 
|-id=966 bgcolor=#d6d6d6
| 140966 ||  || — || November 12, 2001 || Socorro || LINEAR || HYG || align=right | 5.4 km || 
|-id=967 bgcolor=#d6d6d6
| 140967 ||  || — || November 12, 2001 || Socorro || LINEAR || EOS || align=right | 4.0 km || 
|-id=968 bgcolor=#d6d6d6
| 140968 ||  || — || November 12, 2001 || Socorro || LINEAR || THM || align=right | 7.3 km || 
|-id=969 bgcolor=#d6d6d6
| 140969 ||  || — || November 12, 2001 || Socorro || LINEAR || EOS || align=right | 3.9 km || 
|-id=970 bgcolor=#d6d6d6
| 140970 ||  || — || November 12, 2001 || Socorro || LINEAR || — || align=right | 6.6 km || 
|-id=971 bgcolor=#d6d6d6
| 140971 ||  || — || November 12, 2001 || Socorro || LINEAR || — || align=right | 5.3 km || 
|-id=972 bgcolor=#d6d6d6
| 140972 ||  || — || November 12, 2001 || Socorro || LINEAR || EOS || align=right | 3.9 km || 
|-id=973 bgcolor=#E9E9E9
| 140973 ||  || — || November 12, 2001 || Socorro || LINEAR || — || align=right | 3.3 km || 
|-id=974 bgcolor=#d6d6d6
| 140974 ||  || — || November 12, 2001 || Socorro || LINEAR || EOS || align=right | 3.4 km || 
|-id=975 bgcolor=#d6d6d6
| 140975 ||  || — || November 15, 2001 || Palomar || NEAT || — || align=right | 3.8 km || 
|-id=976 bgcolor=#d6d6d6
| 140976 ||  || — || November 15, 2001 || Palomar || NEAT || — || align=right | 6.1 km || 
|-id=977 bgcolor=#d6d6d6
| 140977 ||  || — || November 13, 2001 || Haleakala || NEAT || EUP || align=right | 8.9 km || 
|-id=978 bgcolor=#d6d6d6
| 140978 ||  || — || November 15, 2001 || Palomar || NEAT || — || align=right | 4.3 km || 
|-id=979 bgcolor=#d6d6d6
| 140979 ||  || — || November 11, 2001 || Kitt Peak || Spacewatch || MEL || align=right | 5.0 km || 
|-id=980 bgcolor=#d6d6d6
| 140980 Blanton ||  ||  || November 12, 2001 || Apache Point || SDSS || — || align=right | 2.6 km || 
|-id=981 bgcolor=#E9E9E9
| 140981 ||  || — || November 16, 2001 || Kitt Peak || Spacewatch || — || align=right | 3.8 km || 
|-id=982 bgcolor=#d6d6d6
| 140982 ||  || — || November 17, 2001 || Socorro || LINEAR || — || align=right | 3.8 km || 
|-id=983 bgcolor=#E9E9E9
| 140983 ||  || — || November 17, 2001 || Socorro || LINEAR || GEF || align=right | 2.0 km || 
|-id=984 bgcolor=#d6d6d6
| 140984 ||  || — || November 17, 2001 || Socorro || LINEAR || HYG || align=right | 4.5 km || 
|-id=985 bgcolor=#d6d6d6
| 140985 ||  || — || November 17, 2001 || Socorro || LINEAR || — || align=right | 4.4 km || 
|-id=986 bgcolor=#E9E9E9
| 140986 ||  || — || November 17, 2001 || Socorro || LINEAR || — || align=right | 3.0 km || 
|-id=987 bgcolor=#d6d6d6
| 140987 ||  || — || November 17, 2001 || Socorro || LINEAR || — || align=right | 5.5 km || 
|-id=988 bgcolor=#d6d6d6
| 140988 ||  || — || November 17, 2001 || Socorro || LINEAR || — || align=right | 8.8 km || 
|-id=989 bgcolor=#d6d6d6
| 140989 ||  || — || November 17, 2001 || Socorro || LINEAR || — || align=right | 4.1 km || 
|-id=990 bgcolor=#d6d6d6
| 140990 ||  || — || November 17, 2001 || Socorro || LINEAR || — || align=right | 3.8 km || 
|-id=991 bgcolor=#d6d6d6
| 140991 ||  || — || November 17, 2001 || Socorro || LINEAR || K-2 || align=right | 2.0 km || 
|-id=992 bgcolor=#d6d6d6
| 140992 ||  || — || November 17, 2001 || Socorro || LINEAR || — || align=right | 3.0 km || 
|-id=993 bgcolor=#d6d6d6
| 140993 ||  || — || November 17, 2001 || Socorro || LINEAR || VER || align=right | 6.2 km || 
|-id=994 bgcolor=#d6d6d6
| 140994 ||  || — || November 17, 2001 || Socorro || LINEAR || — || align=right | 6.1 km || 
|-id=995 bgcolor=#d6d6d6
| 140995 ||  || — || November 17, 2001 || Socorro || LINEAR || — || align=right | 4.2 km || 
|-id=996 bgcolor=#E9E9E9
| 140996 ||  || — || November 17, 2001 || Socorro || LINEAR || — || align=right | 3.7 km || 
|-id=997 bgcolor=#d6d6d6
| 140997 ||  || — || November 17, 2001 || Socorro || LINEAR || — || align=right | 7.1 km || 
|-id=998 bgcolor=#d6d6d6
| 140998 ||  || — || November 17, 2001 || Socorro || LINEAR || — || align=right | 7.4 km || 
|-id=999 bgcolor=#d6d6d6
| 140999 ||  || — || November 17, 2001 || Socorro || LINEAR || — || align=right | 8.3 km || 
|-id=000 bgcolor=#d6d6d6
| 141000 ||  || — || November 17, 2001 || Socorro || LINEAR || — || align=right | 6.9 km || 
|}

References

External links 
 Discovery Circumstances: Numbered Minor Planets (140001)–(145000) (IAU Minor Planet Center)

0140